= Greenwich Art Society =

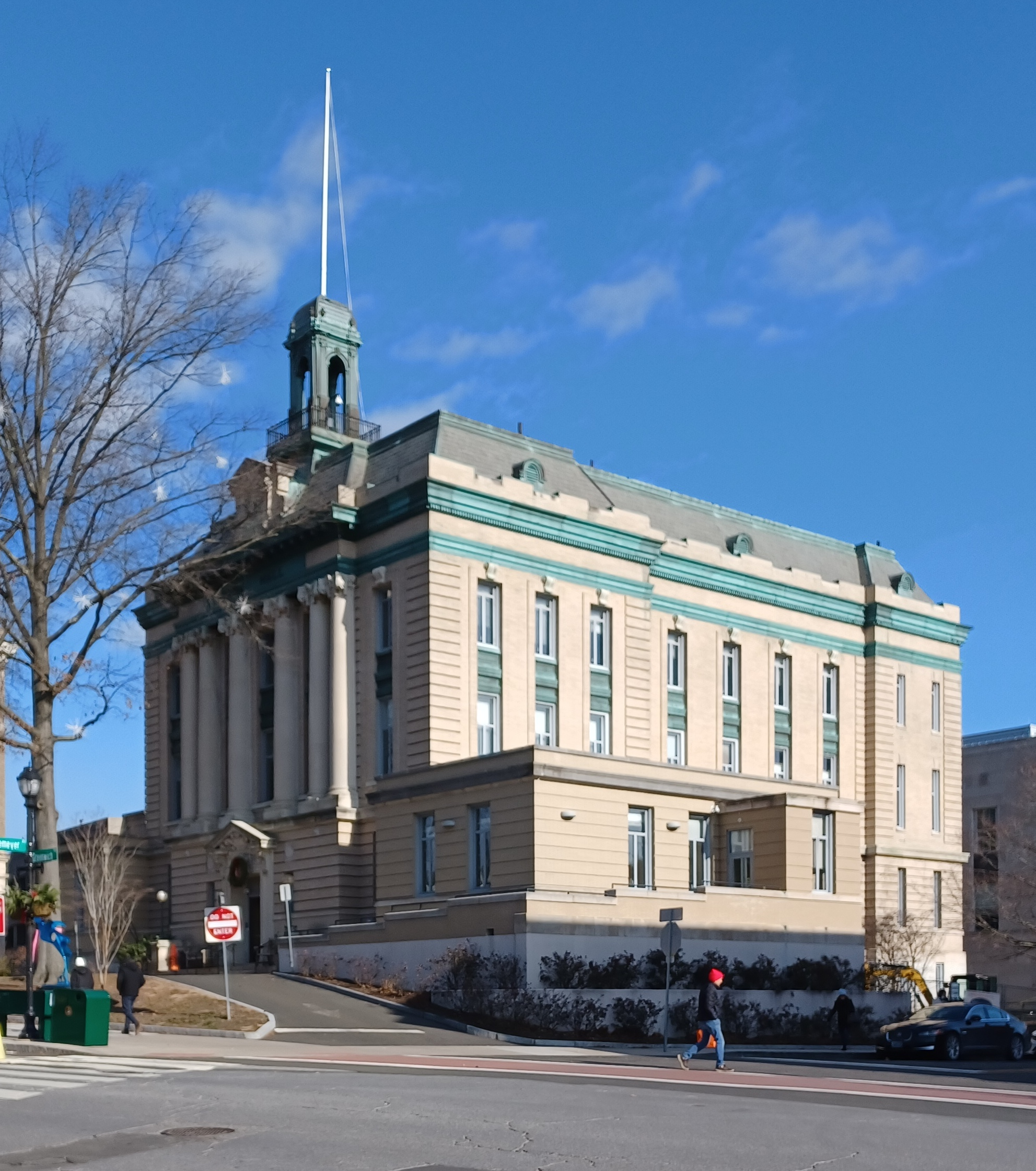
- Formation: 1912
- Type: Non-profit organization
- Headquarters: Greenwich, Connecticut
- Website: greenwichartsociety.org
- Formerly called: The Greenwich Society of Artists

The Greenwich Art Society, formerly the The Greenwich Society of Artists, is an organization dedicated to promoting arts education in the town of Greenwich, Connecticut. It was founded in 1912 by artists affiliated with the "Cos Cob School," and many associated with the development of the American Impressionist movement, who sought “the promotion and maintenance of the fine arts and the exhibition of works of art in Greenwich.”

== History ==
As wealthy New Yorkers looked to move out of the city at the end of the 19th century, Greenwich evolved from a rural village to a bustling suburb with an established artists’ colony and a growing market for art. Theodore Robinson and John Henry Twachtman taught summer art classes at the Bush-Holley House, and Twachtman and Leonard Ochtman were living in Greenwich full-time.

The first president of the Greenwich Society of Artists was Edward Clark Potter, best known as the sculptor of the lions at the New York Public Library Main Branch; Leonard Ochtman served as the first vice-president. Other notable early Society members include John Plumer Ludlum, Elmer Livingston MacRae, William Bunker Tubby, Joseph Howland Hunt, Sr., Dorothy Ochtman, Mina Fonda Ochtman, Matilda Browne, Charles Henry Ebert, Florence W. Gotthold, George Wharton Edwards, Henry Bill Selden, J. Alden Twachtman (son of John Henry Twachtman) and other artists and patrons affiliated with the Cos Cob Art Colony. A number of these artists were active in other influential organizations at that time, including the Association of American Painters and Sculptors, the group responsible for the 1913 Armory Show. Dorothy Ochtman served as Secretary of the Society from 1928-1946, and President from 1947-1948.

The Society held its first show in September 1912 in a house donated to the town by Robert M. Bruce, which would become the Bruce Museum. Until 1926, the Society continued to organize all of the Bruce Museum’s exhibitions, and the core of the museum's permanent collection grew through purchases and gifts from these exhibitions. In 1928, the Annual Members' Exhibition of the society was moved to the art gallery of the Greenwich Library.

In 1956, the Society expanded its mission: “to further art education and to awaken and stimulate interest in arts and crafts in the Town of Greenwich by means of classes, demonstrations, lectures and exhibitions.” The name was changed the Greenwich Art Society in 1958 when it was incorporated as a non-profit organization and began providing art instruction year-round.

== Present day ==
The Greenwich Art Society continues today as an active organization that continues to provide art classes and programs for adults and children, exhibitions for its members, workshops, and gallery trips.
