= Ochtman =

Ochtman is a surname. Notable people with the surname include:

- Dorothy Ochtman (1892–1971), American painter
- Leonard Ochtman (1854–1934), Dutch-American painter
- Mina Fonda Ochtman (1862–1924), American painter
