= Leonard Ochtman =

American painter (1854–1934)

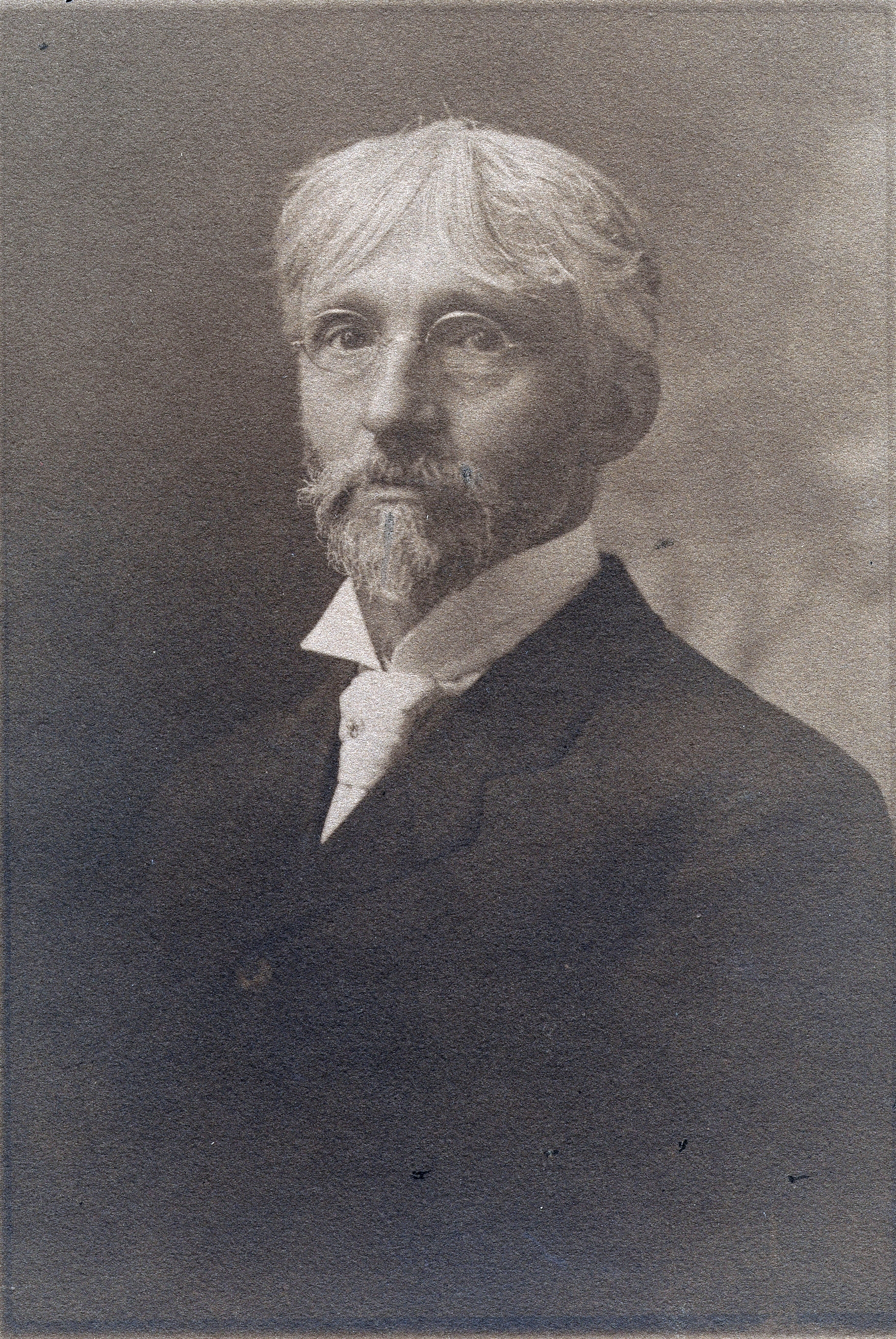
- Born: October 21, 1854; Zonnemaire, Netherlands
- Died: October 27, 1934 (aged 80); Greenwich, Connecticut, United States
- Movement: Impressionism
- Spouse: Mina Fonda Ochtman
- Elected: National Academy of Design, Greenwich Society of Artists (co-founder)

Leonard Ochtman (October 21, 1854 – October 27, 1934) was a Dutch-American Impressionist painter who specialized in landscapes. He was a founding member of the Cos Cob Art Colony and the Greenwich Society of Artists.

== Biography and career ==
He was born in Zonnemaire, Netherlands as the son of a decorative painter. His family moved to Albany, New York in 1866. Starting at a young age, Ochtman worked as a draftsman at a wood-working firm in Albany. In 1879, Ochtman moved from Albany to New York City where he roomed with fellow painter, Charles Warren Eaton.

In New York City, Ochtman worked with a group of artists who were important in the development of the impressionist movement in the United States. Although he took classes at the Art Students League of New York in 1879, he was primarily self-taught. For several years Ochtman's studio in New York City was located in the same building as that of George Inness, the dean of the Tonalism movement, and the two painters admired each other's work. In 1882 he began to exhibit landscapes at the National Academy of Design. He traveled to Europe in 1886, where he was influenced by the Dutch Hague School painters Jacob Maris and Anton Mauve. He returned to New York in 1887. He became a National Academician in 1904. His most characteristic pictures are scenes on Long Island Sound and the Connecticut countryside.

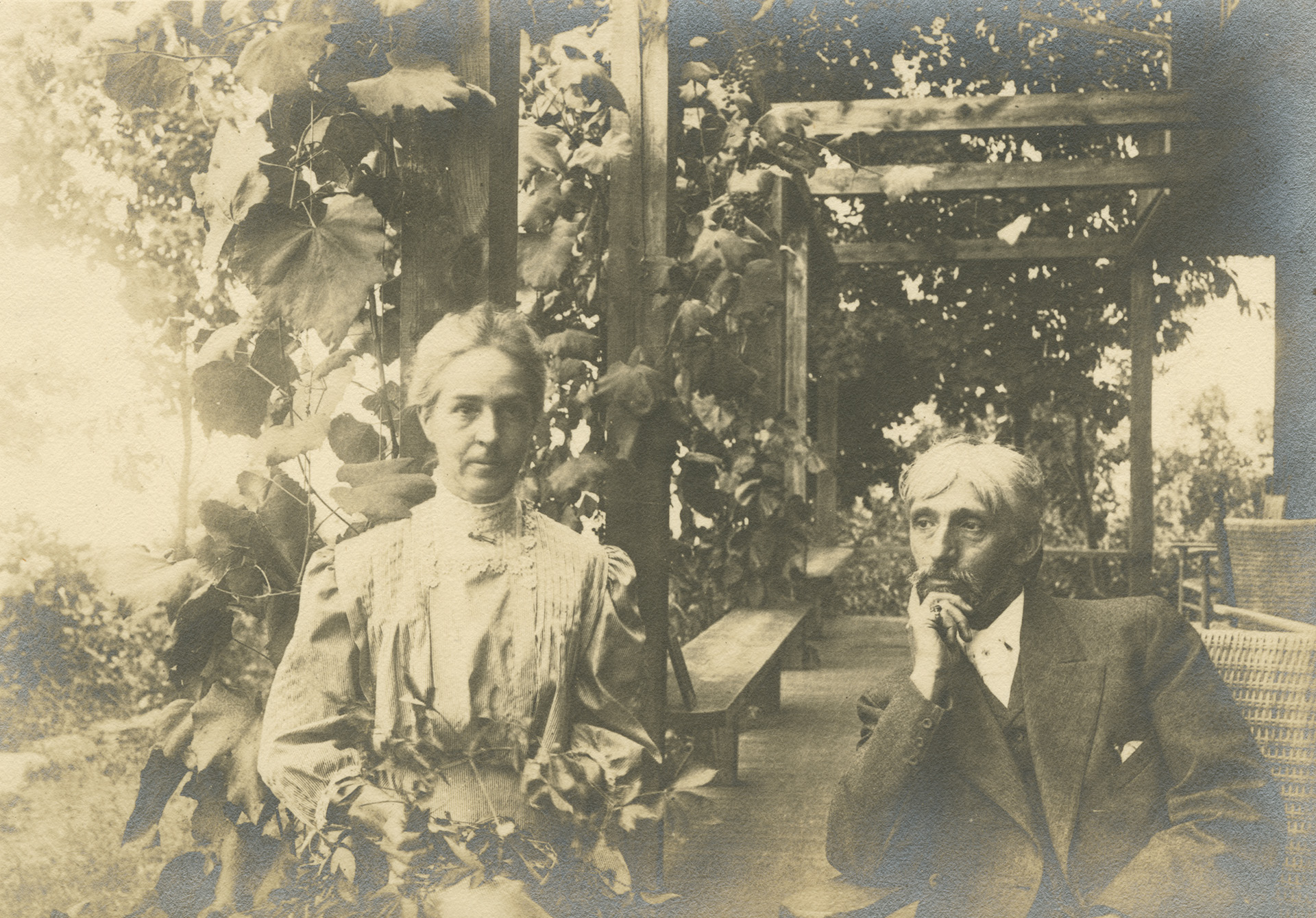
Leonard and Mina Fonda Ochtman in 1906 or 1907

Ochtman and his wife, the accomplished American Impressionist painter Mina Fonda Ochtman (1862–1924), moved to Mianus, Connecticut in 1891, where they became founding members of the Cos Cob Art Colony. Other members of the colony included John Henry Twachtman, Childe Hassam, Julian Alden Weir, Elmer Livingston MacRae, and Theodore Robinson. From Grayledge, the house that he built overlooking the Mianus River, Ochtman instructed younger artists boarding at the nearby Bush-Holley House. In 1910 and 1911, Ochtman held classes for the New York Summer School at Grayledge. Ochtman's students included Clark Voorhees and Harriet Randall Lumis.

In 1912, Ochtman and his friend, the sculptor Edward Clark Potter, formed the Greenwich Society of Artists and the Bruce Museum. Ochtman served as the first vice president of the society in 1912, and President of the society from 1916 to 1932, and as first art curator of the Bruce Museum.

Ochtman's daughter, Dorothy Ochtman (1892–1971), studied under her two artist parents and became an accomplished painter of still lifes.

Leonard Ochtman died at his home in Greenwich, Connecticut on October 27, 1934.
