= Henry Fitch =

Henry Fitch may refer to:

- Henry D. Fitch (1799–1849) early settler of San Diego, California
- Henry S. Fitch (1909–2009), American herpetologist
- Henry Fitch, 19th-century African-American namesake of historic Fitch-Hoose House in Dalton, Massachusetts

== See also ==
- Henry Fitch Taylor (1853–1925), American painter
