= Bruce Museum =

Museum in downtown Greenwich, Connecticut

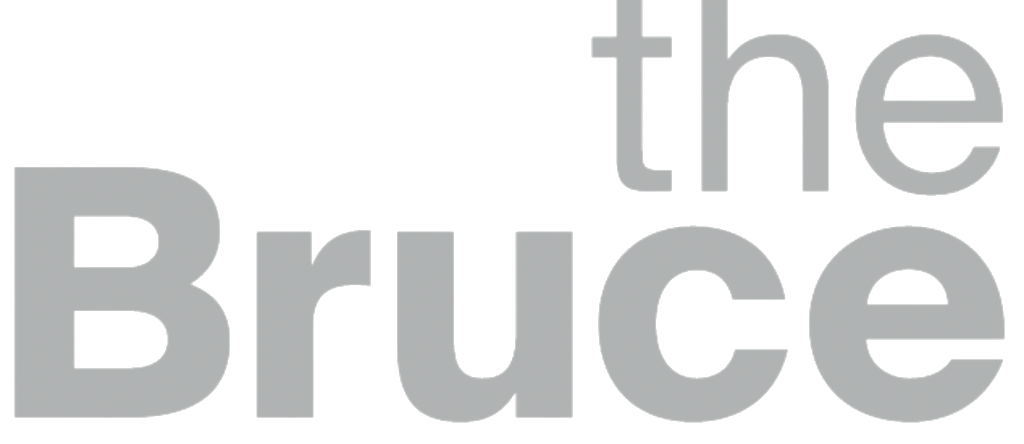

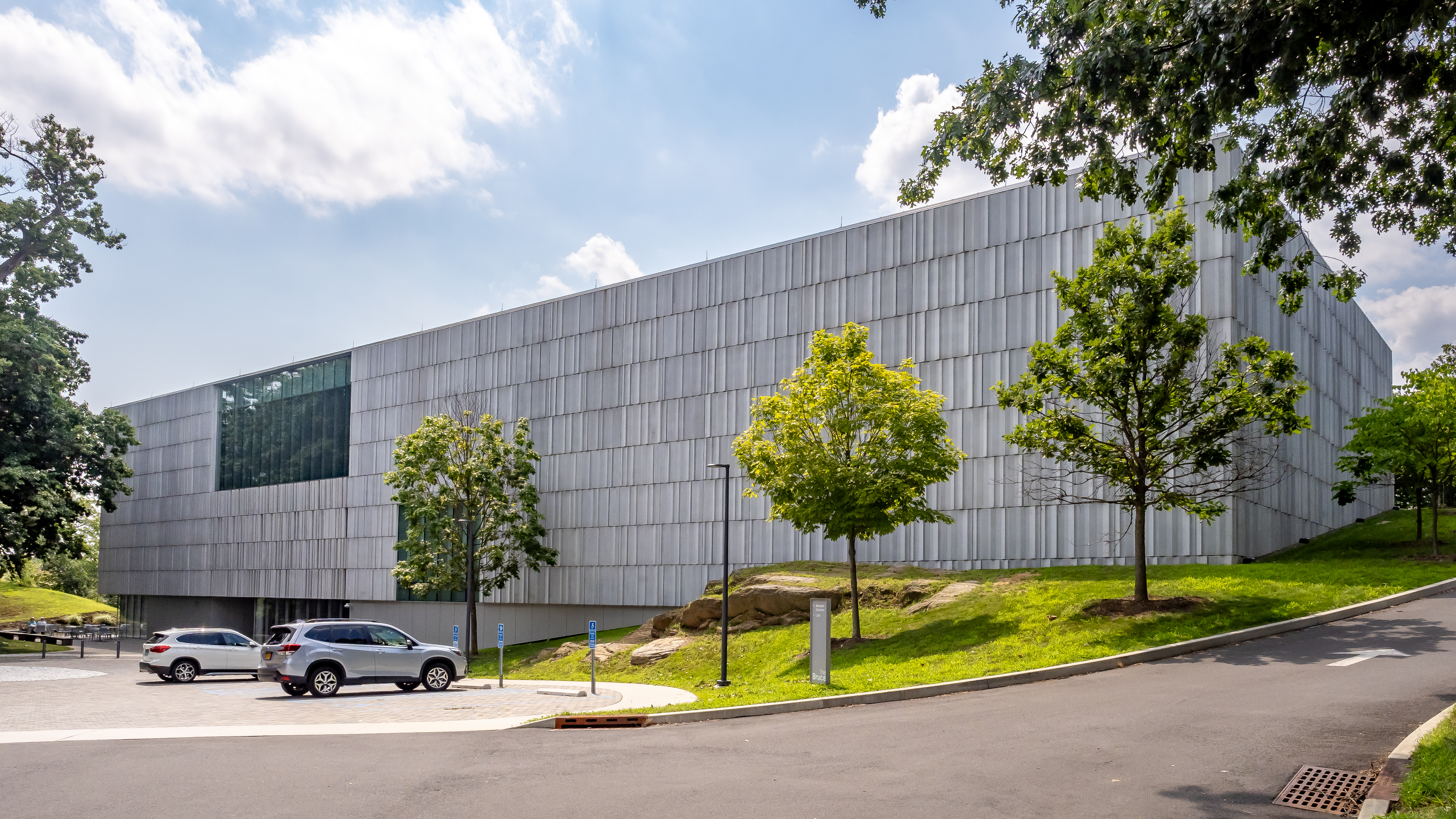
- The New Bruce (2024)
- Established: 1912
- Location: 1 Museum Drive; Greenwich, Connecticut, United States
- Coordinates: 41.0198°N 73.6227°W
- Type: Art, science, natural history
- Executive director: Mary-Kate O’Hare
- Chairs: Karen Keegan, John Hart
- Public transit access: Greenwich
- Website: brucemuseum.org

The Bruce Museum (colloquially referred to as The Bruce or The New Bruce) is an art, science and natural history museum located in Greenwich, Connecticut.

The Bruce's main building sits on a hill in a downtown park, and its tower (not open to the public) can be easily seen by drivers passing by on Interstate 95. Permanent exhibits include minerals, area Native American history and culture, changes in the area landscape and environment by human activity, and dioramas of Connecticut woodland wildlife and birds. The museum hosts changing exhibitions of art, photography, natural history, science, history and culture.

A second location, the Bruce Museum Seaside Center, is maintained at Greenwich Point Park, focusing on beach-related exhibits, including a touch-tank. The museum also has a "Brucemobile" with exhibits in a traveling van for outreach education. The museum hosts frequent lectures, classes and social events. The museum has hosted a local arts festival for over 40 years. The festival includes juried artist selections and is recognized nationally as one of the top fine arts festivals.

Between 2020 and 2023, the museum tripled its size with the addition of The New Bruce, a facility on three floors with over 43,000-square-foot exhibition space. The addition contains the Steven & Alexandra Cohen Education Wing and the William L. Richter Art Wing.

== Art holdings ==
The art collection has a strong emphasis on the Cos Cob School, an Impressionist school, including paintings by Childe Hassam, Emil Carlsen, Leonard Ochtman and Mina Fonda Ochtman. Sculpture includes 19th- and 20th-century work by Auguste Rodin, Hiram Powers, Frederick MacMonnies, and George Segal.

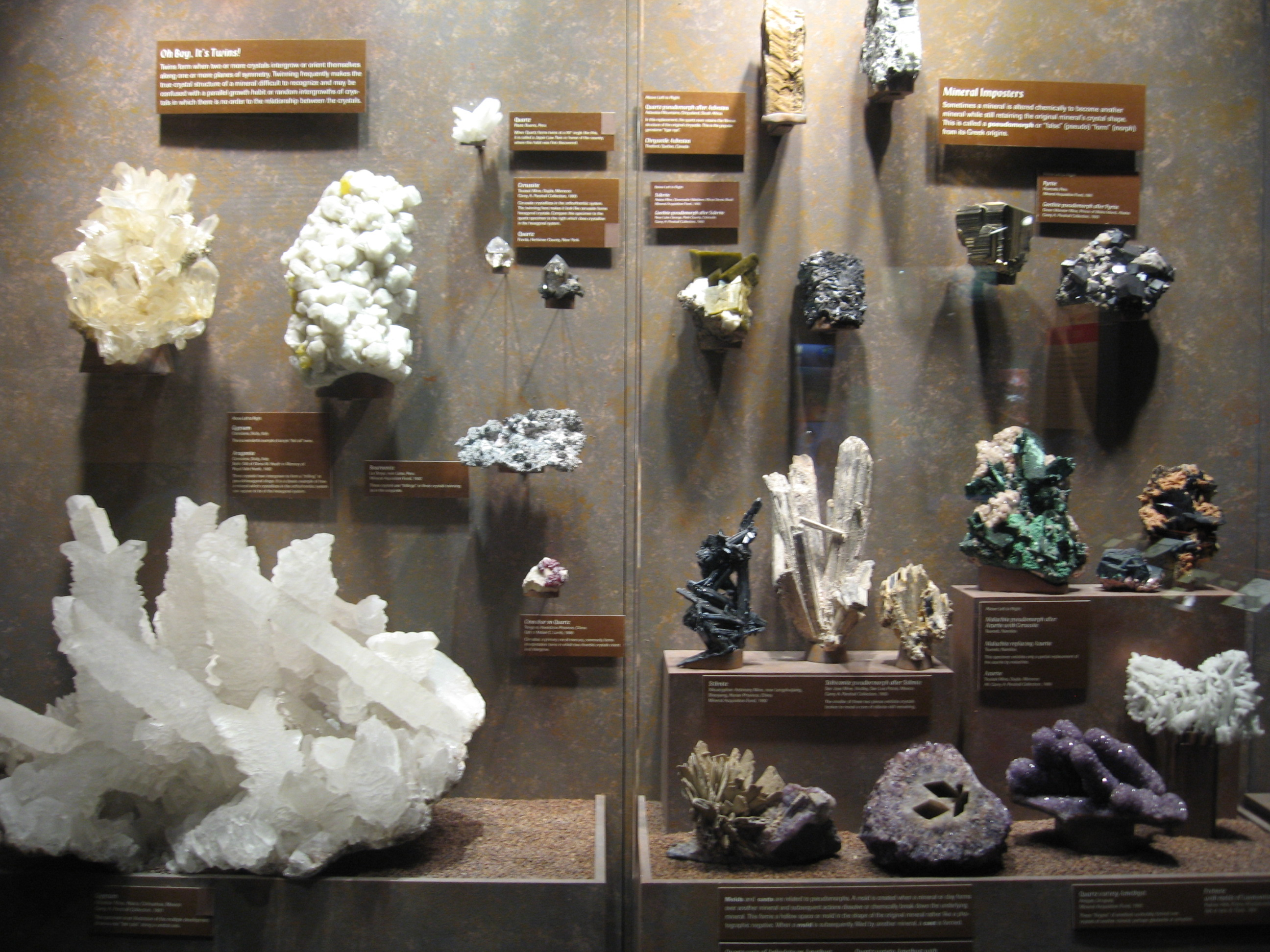
Mineral crystals

== Permanent exhibits ==
The museum has permanent exhibits featuring the natural sciences in regional and global perspective focusing on geology, paleontology, archaeology, local Native Americans, natural history, and the effects of man on the areas around Greenwich. There are several display cases with mineral specimens, including a touchable meteorite, large mineral crystals from around the world and minerals that glow in black light. There are several cases focusing on the changes in the land and environment of Greenwich from pre-settler days up until the early 1900s. A large exhibit focuses on different prehistoric eras and fossils associated with those times. A fifteen-foot diorama displays local woodland wildlife. Other display cases show more birds and animals found in the area. A marine tank holds live small fish, crabs and sea stars for close examination.

== History ==
The Bruce Museum was originally built as private home 1853 for lawyer, clergyman and historian Francis Lister Hawks. In 1858, a wealthy textile merchant and member of the New York Cotton Exchange, Robert Moffat Bruce (1822–1908) bought the house and property. In 1908, he deeded his mansion to the town of Greenwich for it to be used "as a natural history, historical and art museum, for the use and benefit of the public."

The museum's first exhibition opened in 1912, featuring the Greenwich Society of Artists. The society exhibited annually at the Bruce from 1912 to 1926. Several of those artists were also members of the Cos Cob Art Colony. The Museum's early holdings include paintings, drawings, watercolors, and notebooks of Cos Cob Art Colony artists, including George Wharton Edwards, Hobart Jacobs, Leonard Ochtman and Mina Fonda Ochtman.

In 1992, the Bruce Museum, Inc. established as a non-profit organization. That same year, the museum started a project to completely renovate its building. When it reopened in September 1993, the museum featured an architectural structure wrapped around the original building, housing galleries for art on one side of the main pavilion with galleries of environmental history on the other. In 1998, the Bruce Museum received accreditation from the American Alliance of Museums (formerly known as the American Association of Museums).
