= Cos Cob art colony =

The Cos Cob art colony was a group of artists, many of them American Impressionists, who gathered during the summer months in and around Cos Cob, a section of Greenwich, Connecticut, from about 1890 to about 1920.

In a joking reference to their predilection for painting views of the vernacular architecture, group member Childe Hassam nicknamed the art colony "the Cos Cob Clapboard School of Art."

== History ==
Artists had been coming to Greenwich to paint since the 1870s, but the art colony began to form when John Henry Twachtman settled in Greenwich in 1889. The town was only a short train ride from New York City, yet retained a rural character that appealed to artists. Many of Twachtman's friends came to visit him at his home; among them were Hassam, J. Alden Weir, Theodore Robinson, Henry Fitch Taylor, and Robert Reid. For longer stays, they boarded at the Holley House (now known as the Bush-Holley House), a rambling old saltbox overlooking Cos Cob's small harbor.

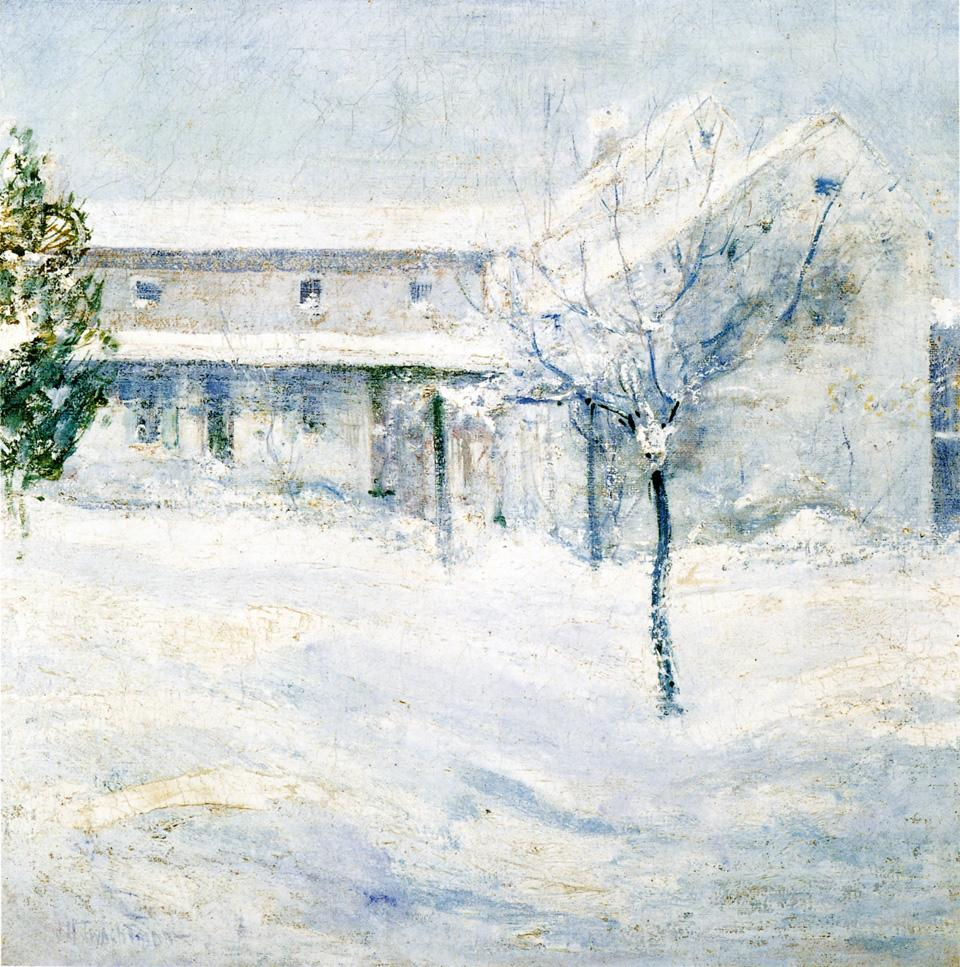
Old Holley House, Cos Cob by John Henry Twachtman (1890-1900)

During the winter, Twachtman and Weir taught at the Art Students League of New York. Probably beginning in 1890, Twachtman established summer art classes in Cos Cob; Weir taught with him in 1892 and 1893. Many of the summer students were enrolled at the Art Students League. Among the artists who first visited Cos Cob as summer students were Elmer Livingston MacRae, Ernest Lawson, Allen Tucker, Charles Ebert, Mary Roberts Ebert, Alice Judson, and Genjiro Yeto.

Other artists associated with the Cos Cob art colony include Leonard Ochtman, Mina Fonda Ochtman, Dorothy Ochtman, Edward Clark Potter, Emil Carlsen, George Wharton Edwards, and Kerr Eby. The art colony also included many writers and editors, including Lincoln Steffens and Willa Cather.

Members of the Cos Cob art colony were deeply involved in organizing the Armory Show, the exhibition that in 1913 introduced modernist European art to a vast American audience. The art colony formed its own hometown organization in 1911. The Greenwich Society of Artists (now the Greenwich Art Society) held its first exhibition in 1912 at the Bruce Museum, which opened to the public for the first time on that occasion.

== See also ==
- Art colony
