= Helen Palmatary =

American anthropologist

Helen Constance Palmatary
- Born: September 12, 1884; Wilmington, Delaware, US
- Died: November 9, 1976 (aged 92); Des Moines, Washington, US
- Education: University of Pennsylvania
- Known for: Anthropologist
- Scientific career
- Workplaces: University of Pennsylvania Museum

Helen Constance Palmatary (Wilmington, Delaware, September 12, 1884 – Des Moines, Washington, November 9, 1976) was an American anthropologist, author, teacher and lecturer. She was an expert on Indigenous ceramics from the Amazon basin, mainly concentrating on those found at the mouth of the Tapajós River and on the island Marajó.

== Biography ==
Helen Palmatary was born on September 12, 1884, to Anna Laura (née Jarvis) and John Edwin Palmatary. She had two younger brothers. She studied at the University of Pennsylvania, after which she worked for 20 years for the University of Pennsylvania Museum as a specialist on Brazil. She undertook four extensive expeditions in this country, including one in 1953 sponsored by the American Philosophical Society.

She was interested in searching for connections between the Indigenous ceramics found in the Amazon Basin, the Guianas, the Antilles, Central America and the southern United States. Alfred Kroeber commented on the systematic way in which she did this, drawing up a list of thirty-five structural and stylistic pottery traits from eleven areas in the Americas and comparing the ceramics from the Tapajó River near Santarém, Pará against them. In the words of Wendell C. Bennett, this systematic way of working provided a much needed overview on the topic of Tapajó pottery. Robert Chester Smith even described these studies as "the last word on the subject". A. J. R. Russell-Wood ranks her among the leading United States archaeologists on pre-Cabralian Brazil together with Betty Meggers and Clifford Evans.

She continued her work researching ceramics from Marajó, an island which due to its location in the Amazon Delta she compared to "an egg in the mouth of a snake". She classified around 5000 objects from this island, describing them and comparing them against her list, again making cultural connections between the Amazon basin and other archaeological areas. Virginia Watson considered her book The pottery of Marajó Island a major contribution to archaeological literature of Brazil, whether the ceramics are treated as objets d'art or as cultural material to be used in historical reconstructions. The Museu Paraense Emílio Goeldi lists her as one of the most frequently mentioned names in archaeological research on Marajoara culture, along with Domingos Penna and Betty Meggers.

According to her obituary, Palmatary was a fellow of the American Anthropological Association and a member of the New York Academy of Sciences, the Academy of Political Science, the American Folklore Society and the Association on American Indian Affairs. She spent her last years in Des Moines, Washington. During this time, she wrote a book for a more general audience about the Amazon expeditions of Gonzalo Pizarro, Francisco de Orellana, Pedro de Ursúa and Pedro Teixeira. Helen Palmatary was buried in Lakewood, Washington.

== Bibliography ==
- Palmatary, H.C. (1936). The Ceramic Art of the Tapajos Indians and Its Relation to Pottery Design in Cultures to the North (Thesis). Graduate School of Arts and Sciences, University of Pennsylvania.
- Palmatary, H.C. (1939). "Tapajó pottery". Etnologiska Studier. 8. Gothenburg: W. Kaudern: 1–136.
- Palmatary, H.C. (1950). The pottery of Marajó Island, Brazil. Philadelphia: American Philosophical Society.
- Palmatary, H.C. (1960). Archaeology of the Lower Tapajos Valley, Brazil. Philadelphia: American Philosophical Society.
- Palmatary, H.C. (1965). The river of the Amazons: its discovery and early exploration, 1500-1743. New York: Carlton Press.
