= Henry Fitch Taylor =

American painter

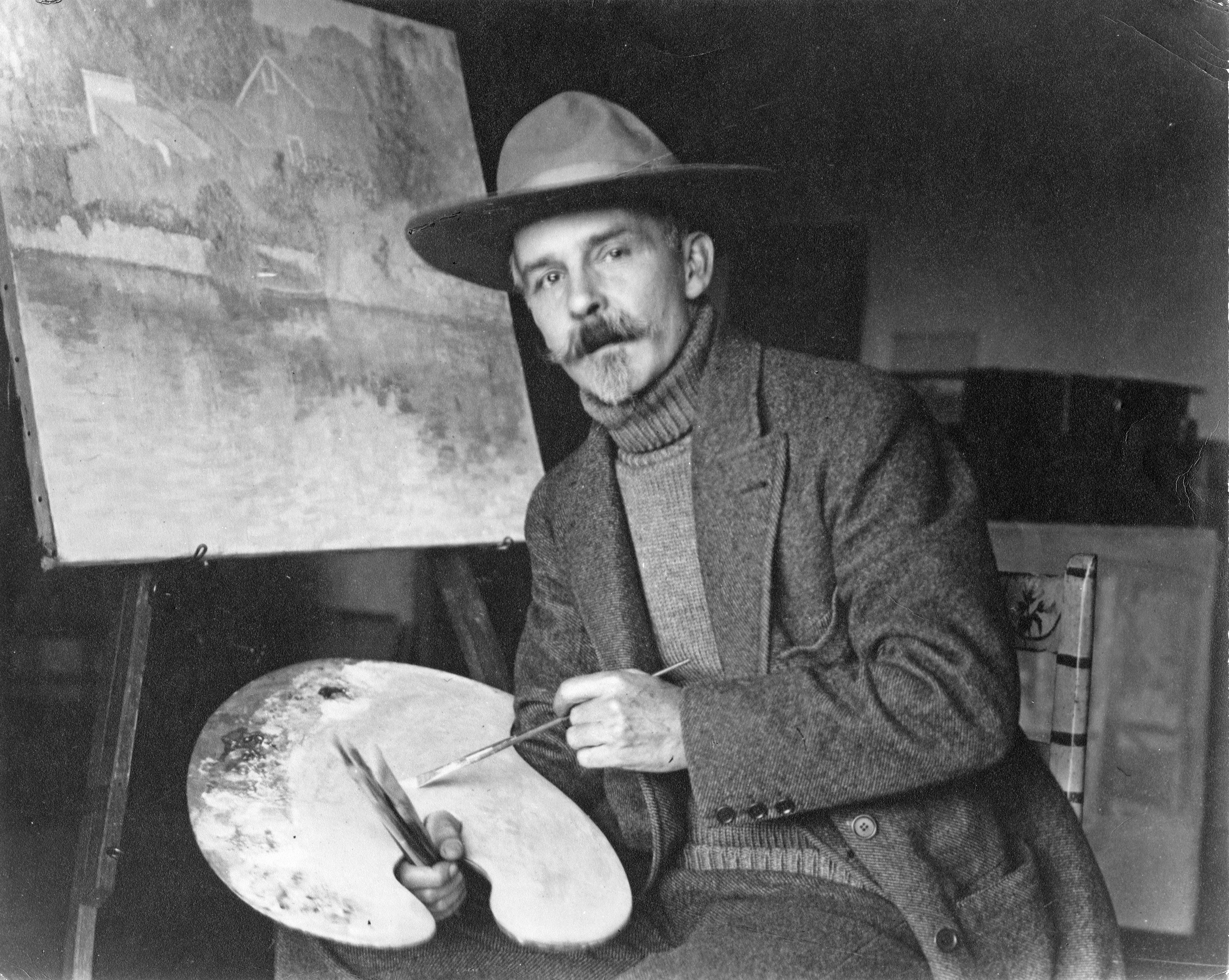
- Henry Fitch Taylor circa 1900, from the Archives of American Art
- Born: September 5, 1853; Cincinnati, Ohio
- Died: September 10, 1925 (aged 72); Plainfield, New Hampshire
- Spouse: Clara Sidney Potter Davidge

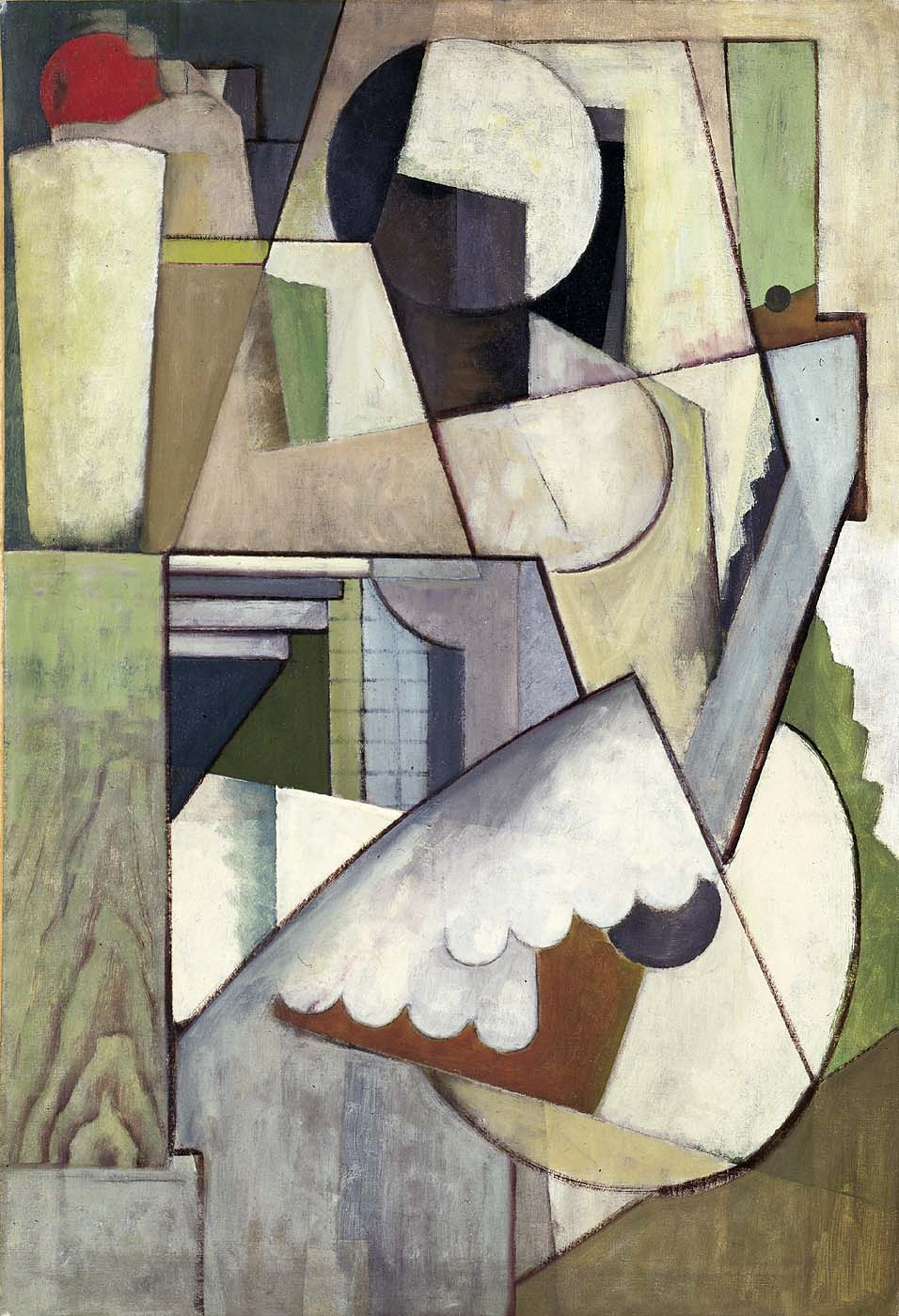
Figure with Guitar II, 1914, Smithsonian American Art Museum

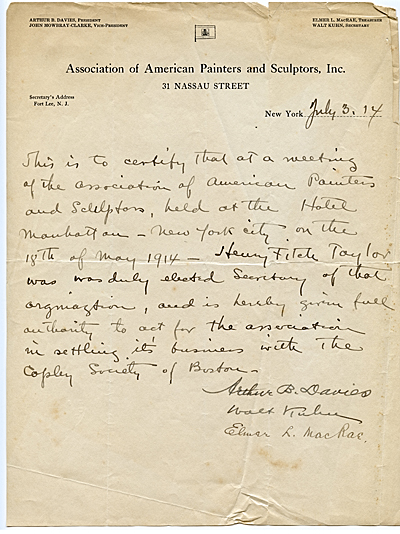
Memorandum certifying Henry Fitch Taylor as Secretary of the Association of American Painters and Sculptors, July 3, 1914, from the Archives of American Art

Henry Fitch Taylor (1853–1925) was an American painter who was to become the oldest among the generation of American artists who responded to and explored Cubism. Taylor served as the first president of the American Association of Artists and Painters (AAPS), the organization which mounted the 1913 Armory Show; he later stepped aside from that role in favor of Arthur B. Davies, but continued to serve as trustee and secretary of AAPS.

== Biography ==
Taylor was born in Cincinnati, Ohio on September 5, 1853. He studied at the Académie Julian, in Paris, and in 1885 went to Barbizon to paint. He returned to America in either 1888 or in 1889, and established his studio in New York City.

Between 1898 and 1908 Taylor resided in Cos Cob, Connecticut. He was part of the Cos Cob Art Colony, where he did some painting but did not show his work. Among his visitors there were John Twachtman, Childe Hassam, Willa Cather, Arthur B. Davies, George Luks, and Walt Kuhn; many of these acquaintances would come to play an important role in Taylor's life as an artist.

Taylor married Clara Sidney Potter Davidge, the daughter of Bishop Henry Codman Potter, on March 20, 1913. They moved to her estate on Staten Island.

=== Armory Show ===
As reported by Jerome Myers in his autobiography Artist In Manhattan

Elmer MacRae and I formed the "Pastelist's Society," for the showing of intimate drawings and pastels. Without our realizing it then, this society was to have important consequences for the subsequent course of American art. Some time afterwards in the Madison Gallery, of which Henry Fitch Taylor was the director, Walt Kuhn, Elmer MacRae and I were exhibiting our work. As passengers on a ship are thrown together and become friendly, so in our voyage through a two week exhibition, time was not lacking to talk shop. Walt Kuhn said to me, "Myers, you and MacRae have done so well with your 'Pastelist's Society,' why can't we get together on a scheme for a large exhibition?" So we agreed to talk it over at my studio nearby, at 7 West 42nd Street in the McHugh Building, across the street from the New York Public Library. (Date: December 14, 1911) There our first meeting was held (Kuhn, MacRae, Taylor, Myers) and a tentative list of members was made up which finally resulted in the organization of the "Association of American Painters and Sculptors." As Walt Kuhn says in his commemorative pamphlet, The Story of the Armory Show: "The group of four men who first set the wheels in motion had no idea of the magnitude to which their early longings would lead."

In the 1913 Armory Show three of Taylor's paintings were shown: Omen, Prostitution, and Dusk Of Morning.

=== A 1921 Tragedy ===
In 1921 Taylor's wife drowned. The New York Times headline read, "Bishop Potter's Daughter Drowns. Body of Mrs. Henry Fitch Taylor Discovered in Marsh Near Her Long Island Home. Had A Spinal Ailment. Belief Is That She Fell Into the Mud and Could Not Free Herself."

=== Legacy ===
Taylor died on September 10, 1925, in Plainfield, New Hampshire.
