= Bush-Holley House =

Historic house in Connecticut, United States

- U.S. National Register of Historic Places
- U.S. National Historic Landmark
- U.S. Historic district – Contributing property
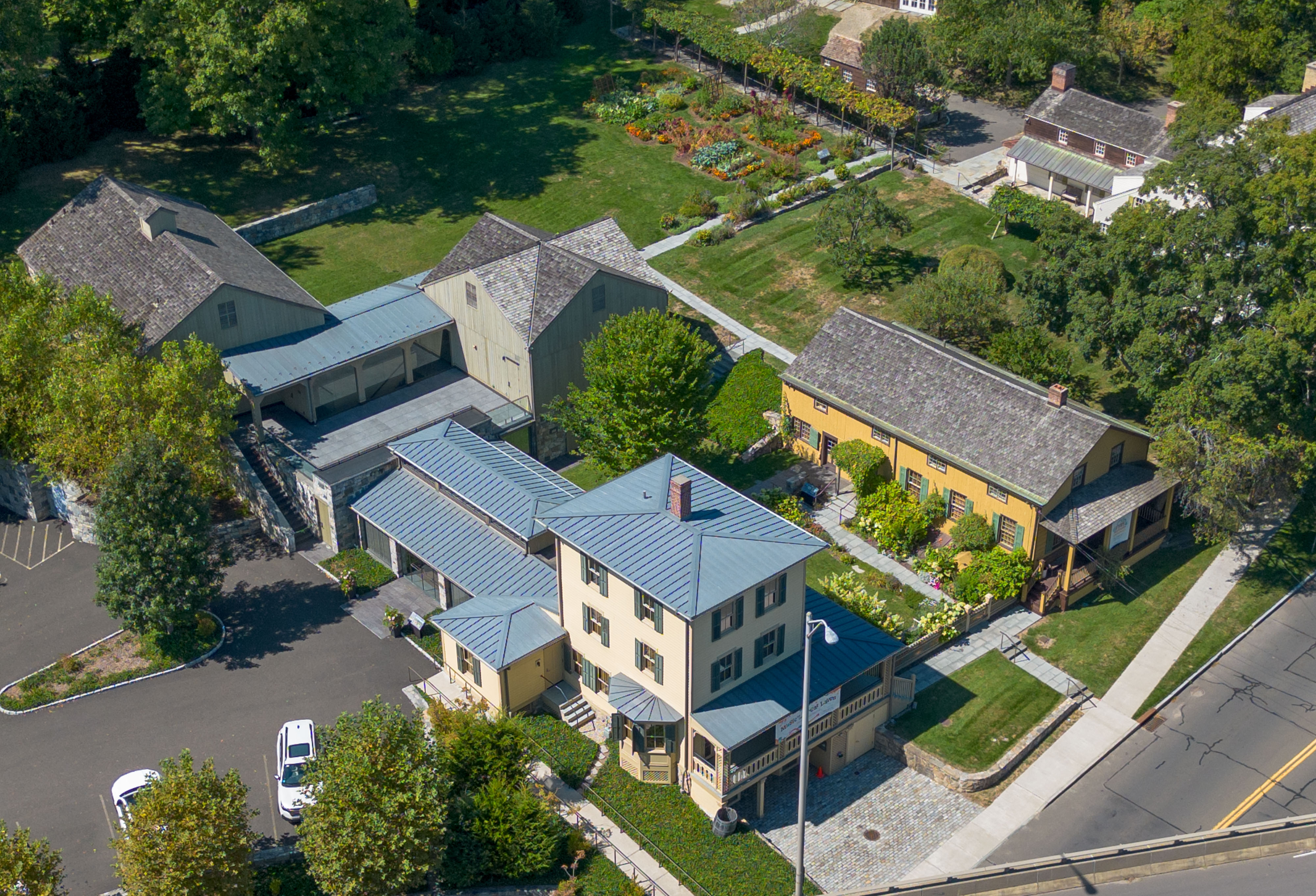
- The Bush-Holley House in 2025

- Location within Connecticut Location within the United States
- Location: 39 Strickland Road, Greenwich, Connecticut
- Coordinates: 41°2′2″N 73°35′52″W
- Built: 1732
- Architectural style: Colonial
- Part of: Strickland Road Historic District (ID77001625)
- NRHP reference No.: 88002694

Significant dates
- Added to NRHP: December 1, 1988
- Designated NHL: July 17, 1991
- Designated CP: March 22, 1990

The Bush-Holley House is a National Historic Landmark and historic house museum at 39 Strickland Road in the Cos Cob section of Greenwich, Connecticut. It was constructed circa 1730 and in the late nineteenth century was a boarding house and the center of the Cos Cob Art Colony, Connecticut's first art colony. From 1890 to 1920, the house was a gathering place for artists, writers and editors, and scores of art students came to study with leading American Impressionists John Henry Twachtman, J. Alden Weir, Theodore Robinson, and Childe Hassam. It is currently operated as a historic site by the Historical Society of the Town of Greenwich, and is open for tours.

== History of the Bush and Holley families ==
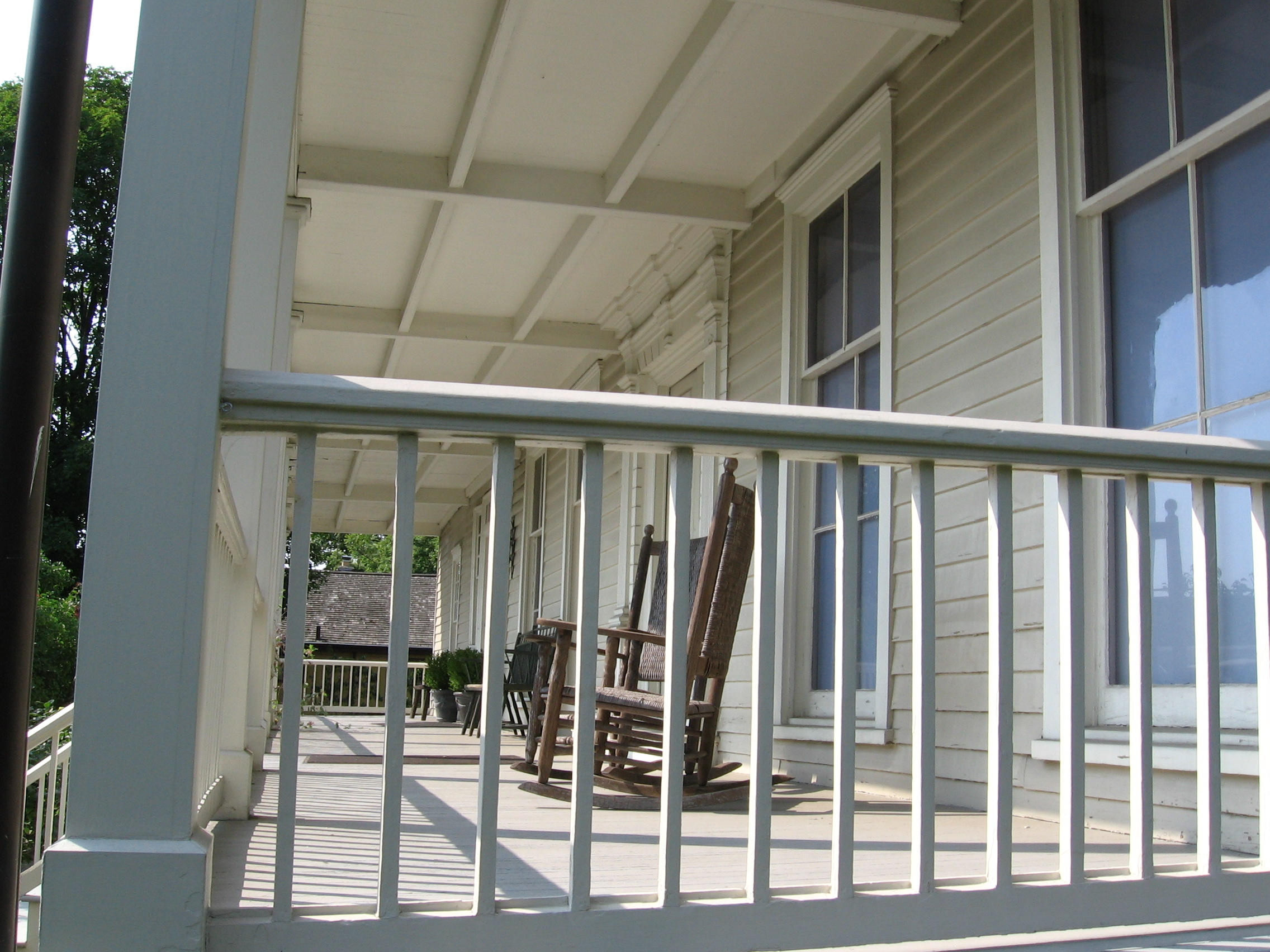
Front porch

=== The Bushes ===
Bush-Holley House was built in stages beginning 1728–1730, with a one-room, two-story structure on a hilltop overlooking the harbor; the main "salt box" house was completed a few years later. In 1738, Justus Bush (originally Bosch), a Dutch Greenwich farmer, purchased the house but did not occupy it. His son David Bush (b. 1733) inherited the house and from 1755 to 1777, made significant changes to it, including joining the two buildings to create an entrance hall, adding wood panelling to the parlor and parlor chamber, and attaching an outbuilding to create the "back kitchen" wing.

In 1777 a widowed David Bush married his sister-in-law, Sarah Scudder Isaacs (b. 1742), adding five of her six children to his five, and fathering five more before his death in 1797. His household also included 10 enslaved adults and children, making him the largest slave-owner in town. David Bush's son, Justus Luke Bush, inherited the home and bought out his brother Ralph Isaac Bush's share of his father's estate.

=== The Holleys and MacRaes ===
The Bush-Holley House passed out of the Bush family in 1848 into the hands of Josephine and Edward Holley. The Holleys added new windows and a second-story porch, and in 1882 began operating it as a place of lodging for visiting artists and writers. In the summer of 1896, Elmer Livingston MacRae visited Cos Cob for a class in outdoor painting. While there, he fell in love with Emma Constant Holley, daughter of Josephine and Edward. MacRae moved into the house full-time in 1899, and married Emma on October 17, 1900. She gave birth to twin girls, Constant and Clarissa, on October 31, 1904.

MacRae succeeded John Henry Twachtman as head of the Cos Cob Art Colony, and for two decades Elmer and Emma continued to run the boardinghouse, which also served as a studio and showcase for MacRae's works.

== Bush-Holley Historic Site ==
The Historical Society of the Town of Greenwich purchased the house in 1957 from the widowed Constant Holley MacRae and first opened it as a museum in 1958. The main house was listed on the National Register of Historic Places in 1988, and was declared a National Historic Landmark in 1991.

Guided tours of Bush-Holley House feature historic interiors related to the Bush and Holley families and an American Impressionist art collection. The William Hegarty Gallery presents historically and artistically significant exhibitions curated by foremost authorities on art and history. Exhibits focus on the art and artists of the Cos Cob art colony, museum collections and aspects of Greenwich history.

== See also ==
- List of the oldest buildings in Connecticut
- List of National Historic Landmarks in Connecticut
- National Register of Historic Places listings in Greenwich, Connecticut
