= George Wharton Edwards =

American painter

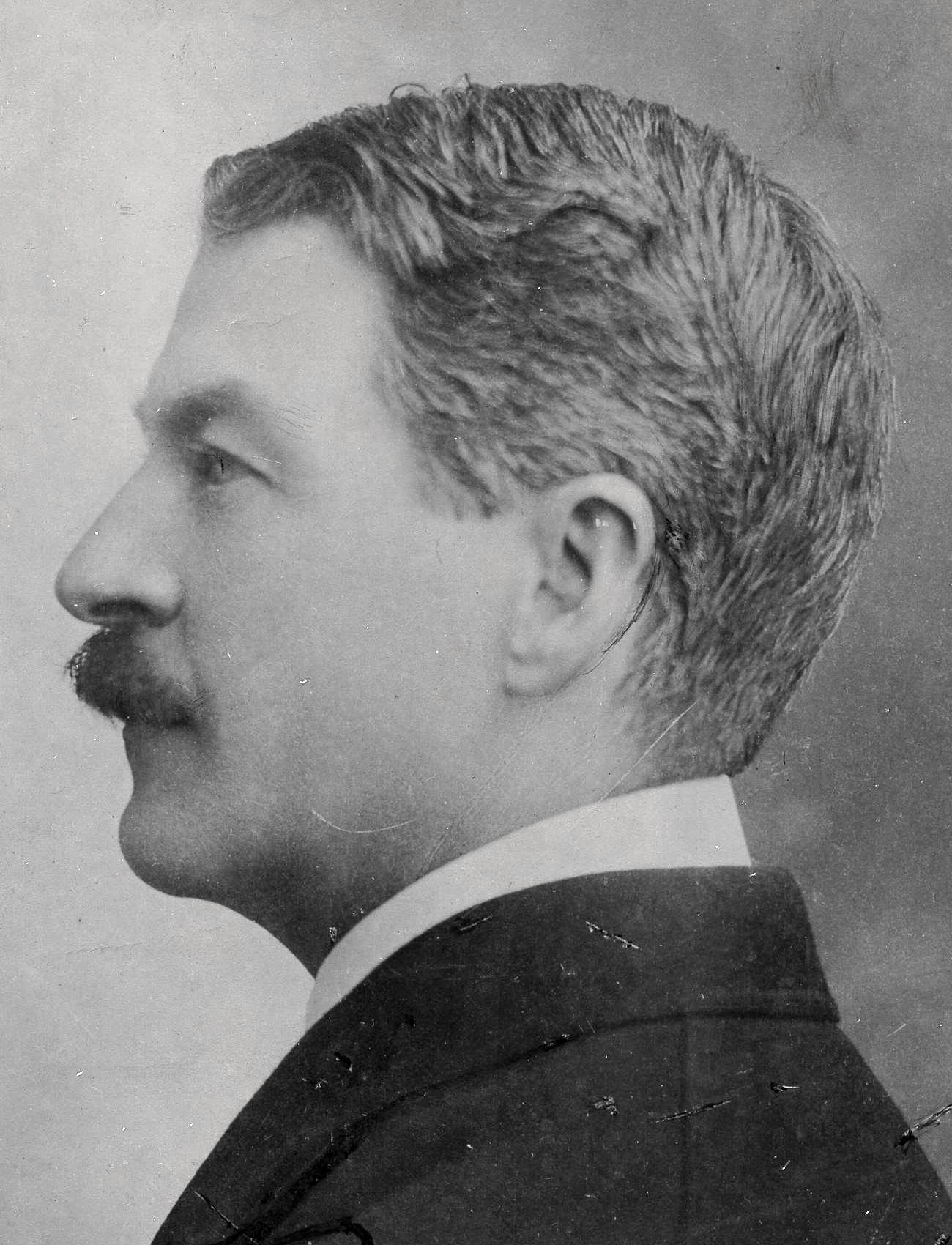
- circa 1908
- Born: 1859
- Died: 1950
- Known for: Painting, impressionist

George Wharton Edwards (March 1859 – January 18, 1950) was an American impressionist painter and illustrator, and the author of several books of travel and historical subjects.

== Early life and education ==
Edwards was born in Fair Haven, Connecticut in March 1859. He showed an interest in art from a young age, and began his painting career on neighborhood barns and fences. He moved to Greenwich in 1912.

Edwards was educated at Antwerp and Paris. He was a member of the Cos Cob Art Colony.

== Art and career ==
Edwards was art director of Collier's magazine from 1896 to 1903. He was manager of the art department of the American Bank Note Company from 1904 to 1912. He was a contributor both as a writer and illustrator for Harper's Magazine

In 1884 Edwards was awarded prizes at an art exhibition in Boston, and went on to receive honors from other cities in the United States and Countries in Europe, including:

- The Order of the King of Belgium
- The Order L'Académie française d'Art
- Chevalier of the Legion of Honor
- Chevalier of the Order of the Crown of Belgium
- Chevalier of the Order of Isabella the Catholic
- Chevalier of the Royal Order of the Crown of Italy

His mural "Hendrik Hudson" hung at the United States Military Academy at West Point, and he painted defense posters for Greenwich in both the first and second world wars. In addition to writing and painting, he designed bookplates for local people and institutions in the North East.

In 1930 he was elected into the National Academy of Design as an Associate member, and became a full Academician in 1945.

Bookplates by George Wharton Edwards

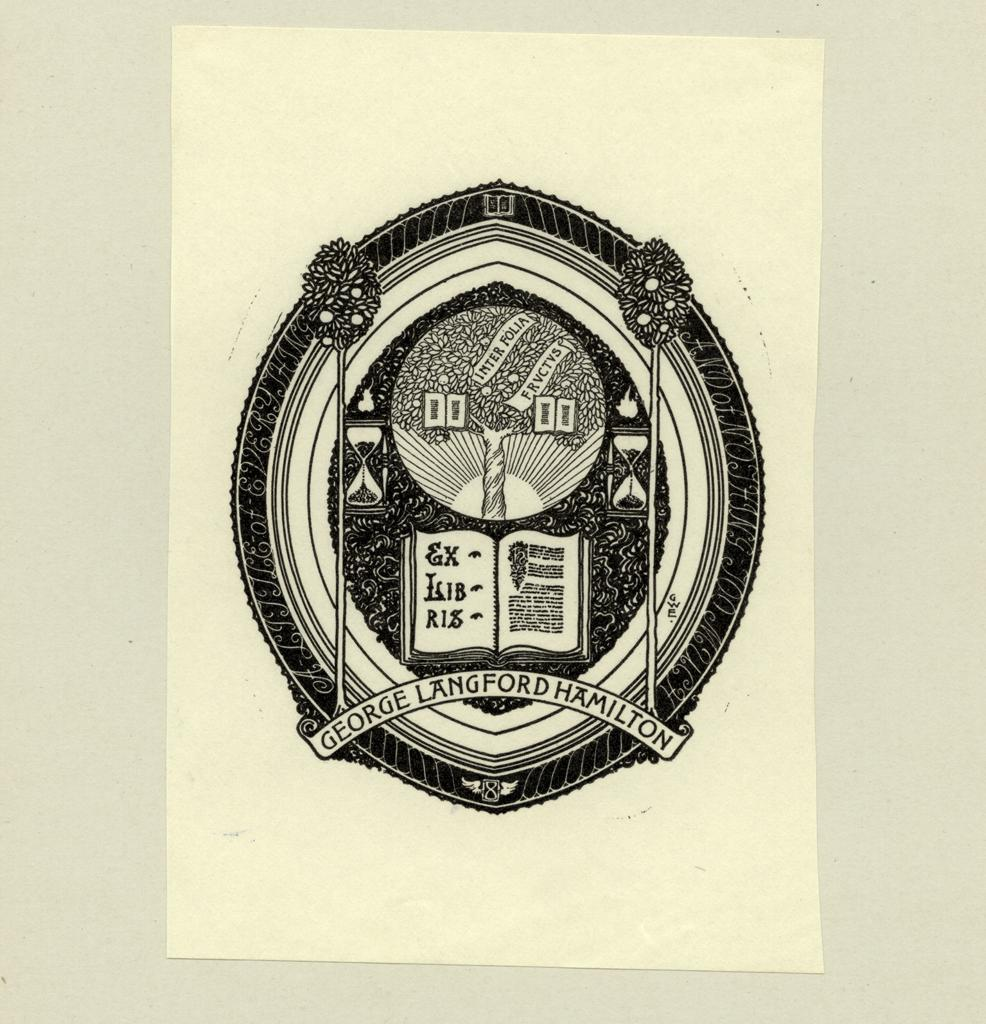
Bookplate for George Langford Hamilton

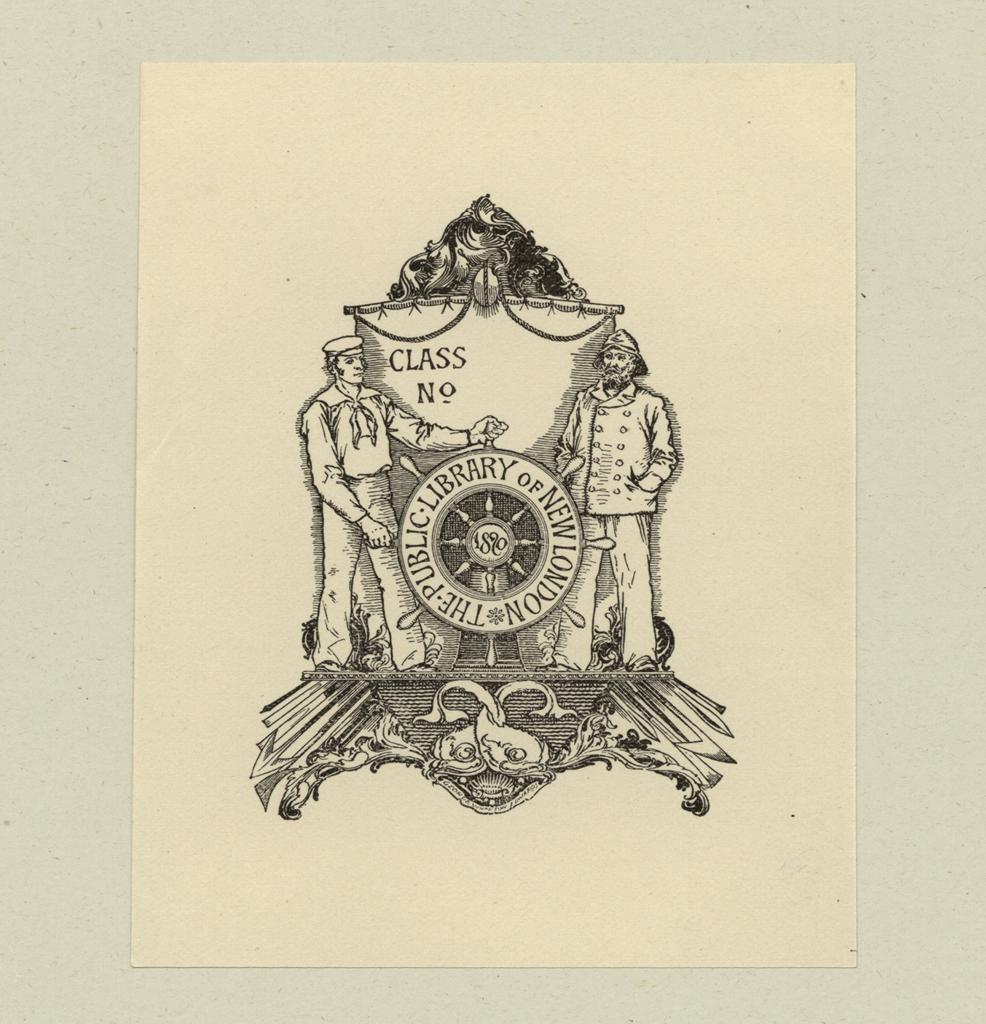
Bookplate for New London Public Library, showing fishermen.

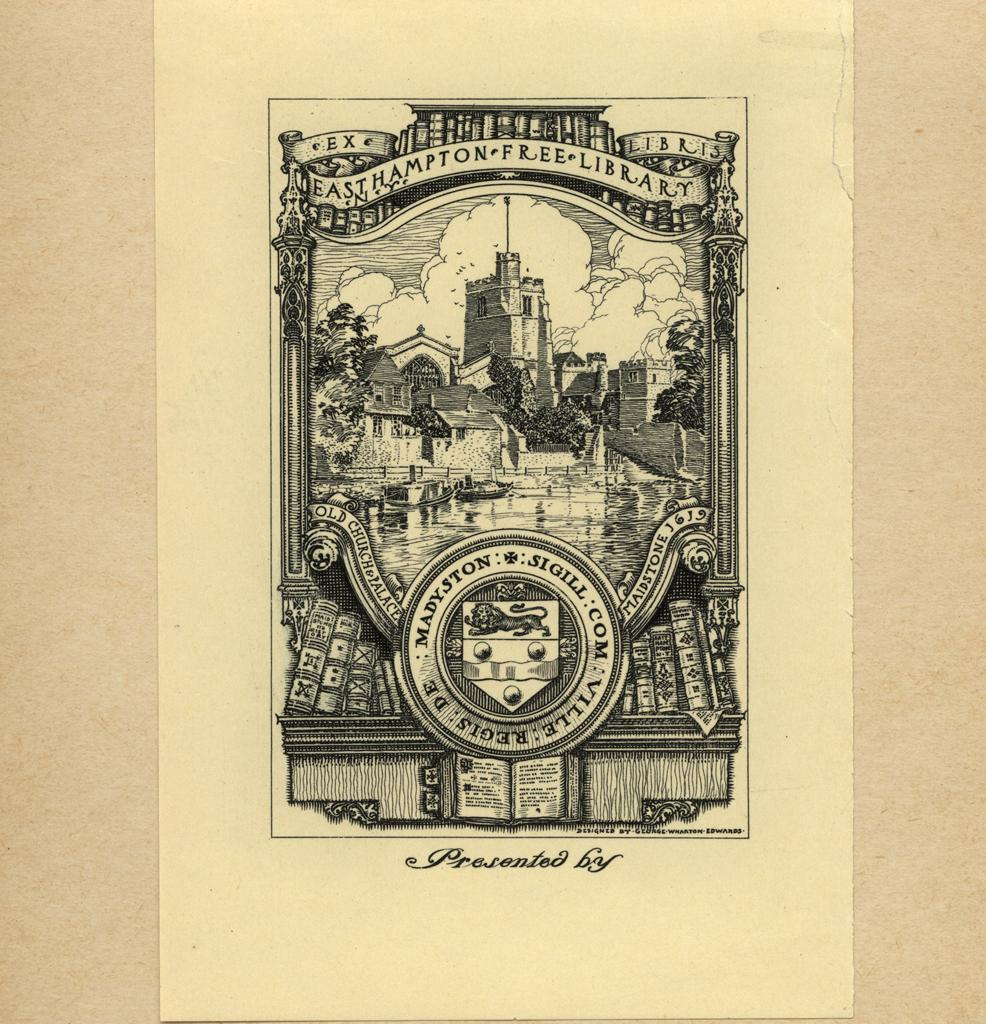
Bookplate for the East Hampton Library

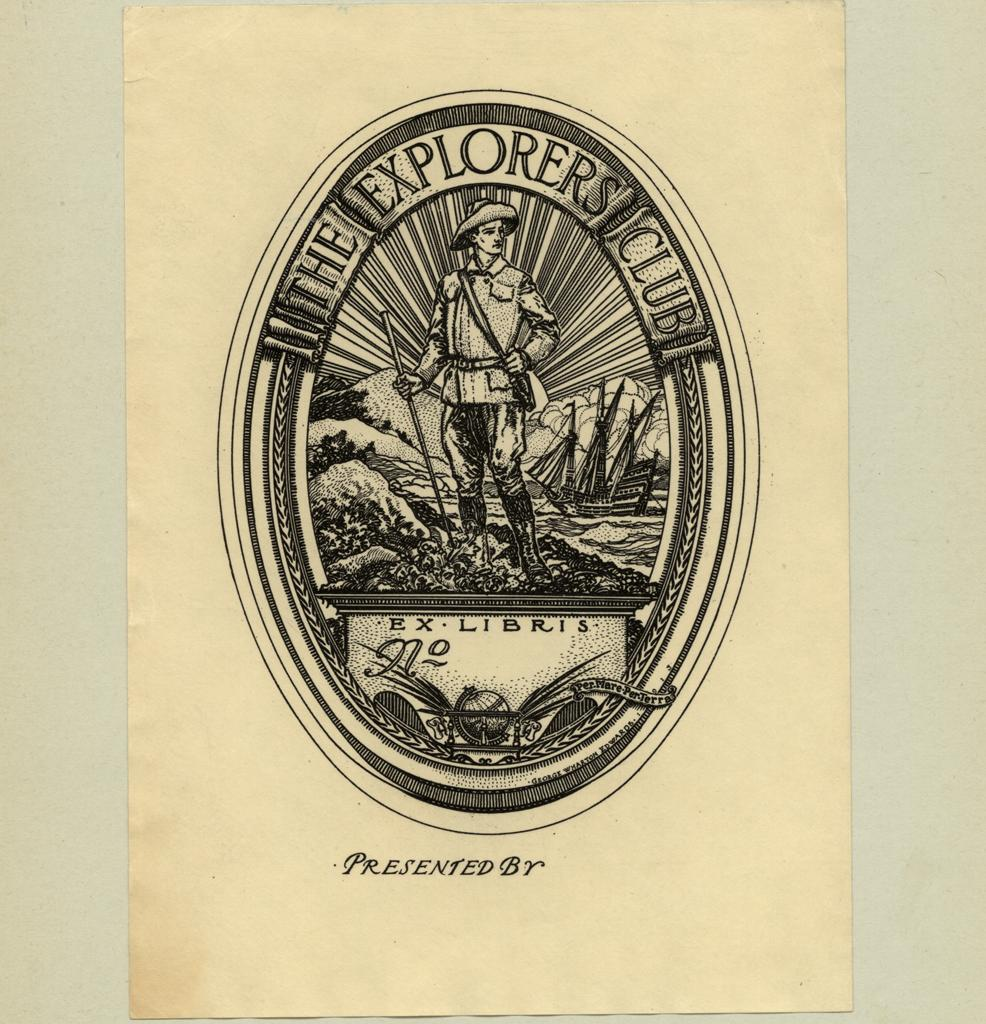
Bookplate for "The Explorers Club"

== Personal life ==
He married Anne Cox in March 1896. They were married until her death in Greenwich, Connecticut in 1923.

Edwards enjoyed traveling, having crossed the Atlantic so frequently that he had "lost count." He wrote and illustrated books about many of the places he had been.

== Death ==
Edwards died in Greenwich, Connecticut at the age of 90.

== Bibliography ==
=== Author and Illustrator ===
- Thumb-Nail Sketches (1893)
- Break o'day, and Other Stories (1896)
- The Book of Old English Ballads (1896)
- The Rivalries of Long and Short Codiac (1899)
- The Forest of Arden (1904)
- Brittany and the Bretons (1910)
- Some Old Flemish Towns (1911)
- Marken and its People (1912)
- Vanished Towers and Chimes of Flanders (1916)
- Vanished Halls and Cathedrals of France (1917)
- Alsace-Lorraine (1918)
- Holland of Today (1919)
- Belgium Old & New (1920)
- London (1922)
- Paris (1924)
- Spain (1926)
- Rome (1928)
- Constantinople. Istamboul. (1930)

=== Illustrator Only ===
- The Princess Pocahontas, by Virginia Watson
- When a Cobbler Ruled a King, by Augusta Huiell Seaman
- Jacqueline of the Carrier Pigeons, by Augusta Huiell Seaman
- Hans Brinker: or, the Silver Skates, by Mary Mapes Dodge
- The Sun Dial: a poem, by Austin Dobson
- The Book of Christmas, by Clement Clarke Moore
- Travels and Adventures of Little Baron Trump and His Wonderful Dog Bulger, by Ingersoll Lockwood (1889)
- Bird gods, by Charles De Kay (1898)
- The Last Leaf Poem, by Oliver Wendell Holmes, Houghton, 1895
