= Fitch–Hoose House =

Historic house in Massachusetts, United States

- U.S. National Register of Historic Places
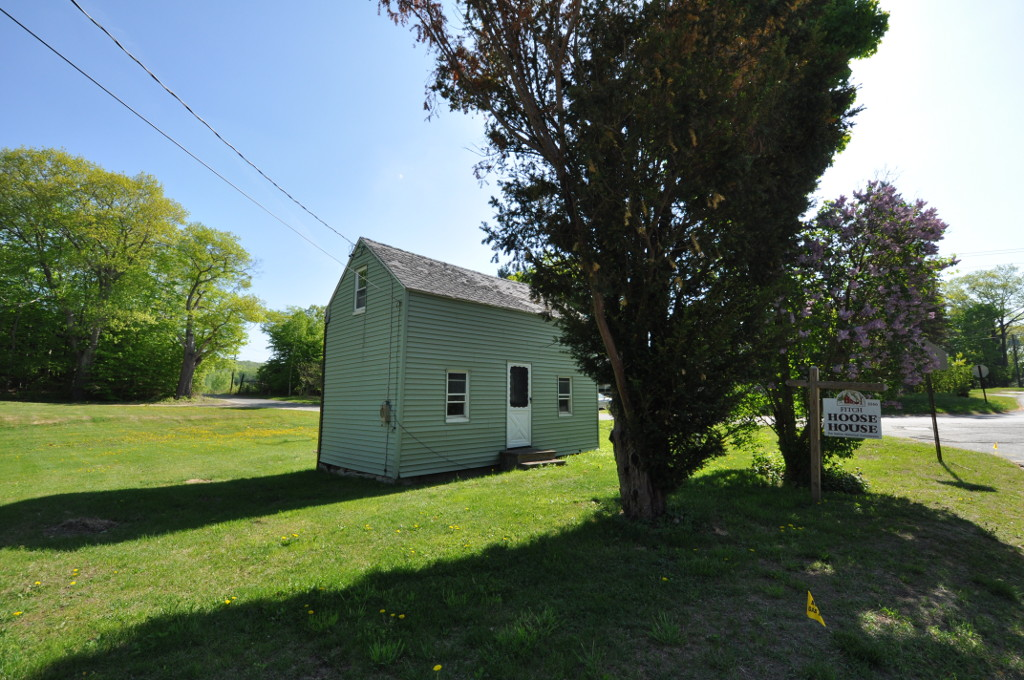

- Location within Massachusetts Location within the United States
- Location: Dalton, Massachusetts
- Coordinates: 42°28′52″N 73°10′32″W
- Area: less than one acre
- Built: 1846
- Built by: William H. Bogart
- NRHP reference No.: 10000390
- Added to NRHP: June 24, 2010

The Fitch–Hoose House (also just the Hoose House) is a single-family house at 6 Gulf Road in Dalton, Massachusetts. The wood-frame house was built in 1846, and is a representative of housing of the African American community in Dalton in the 19th century. Now owned by the town and restored, the property was listed on the National Register of Historic Places in 2010.

== Description and history ==
The Fitch–Hoose House stands on the northern fringe of the village of Dalton, in an area called The Gulf that was known to be settled by freed or escaped African Americans in the early 19th century. It is a small 1 1/2-story wood-frame structure, with a gable roof, brick chimney on one end, and clapboarded exterior. The ground floor of the main facade is three bays wide, with a slightly off-center entrance flanked by sash windows. The attic story is taller than often seen in mid-19th century houses, and is presently devoid of windows; surviving window openings have been covered by modern siding. A shed-roof ell extends to the rear; its roof is at a different pitch than that of the main roof, and the two are not joined.

The house was built in 1848 by William Bogart, and immediately sold to Henry Fitch, a local African American. After a succession of owners, including local papermaking magnate Zenas M. Crane (who had acquired and foreclosed on Henry Fitch's mortgage), the property was purchased in 1868 by Charles Hoose, member of an African American family that had been resident in Dalton since at least 1830. The Hoose family occupied the house until 2001. The property then fell vacant, was taken by the town through tax foreclosure proceedings in 2004. Since then it has been the focus of restoration work by the local historic commission.

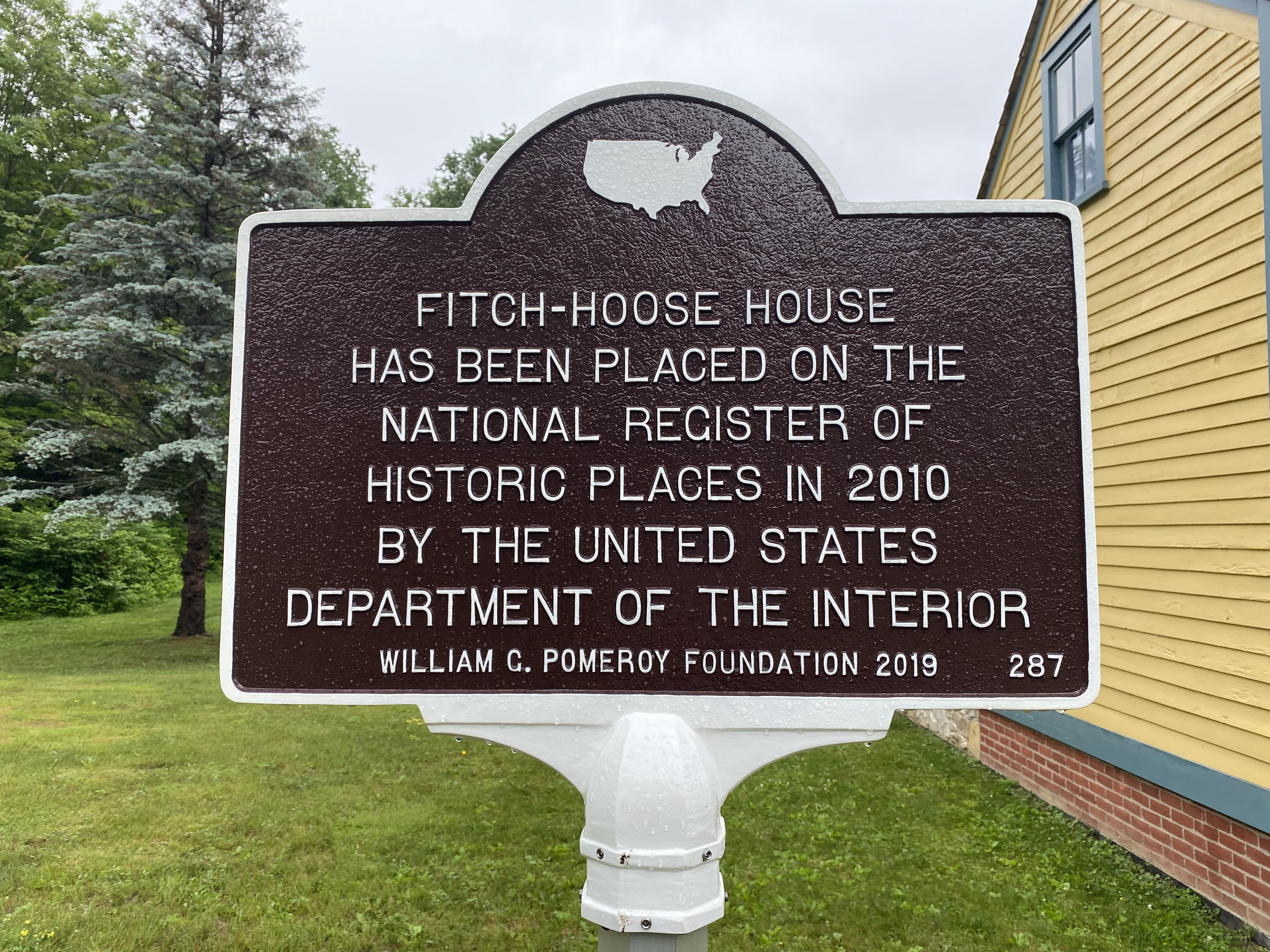
Historical Marker at the Fitch-Hoose House in Dalton, MA

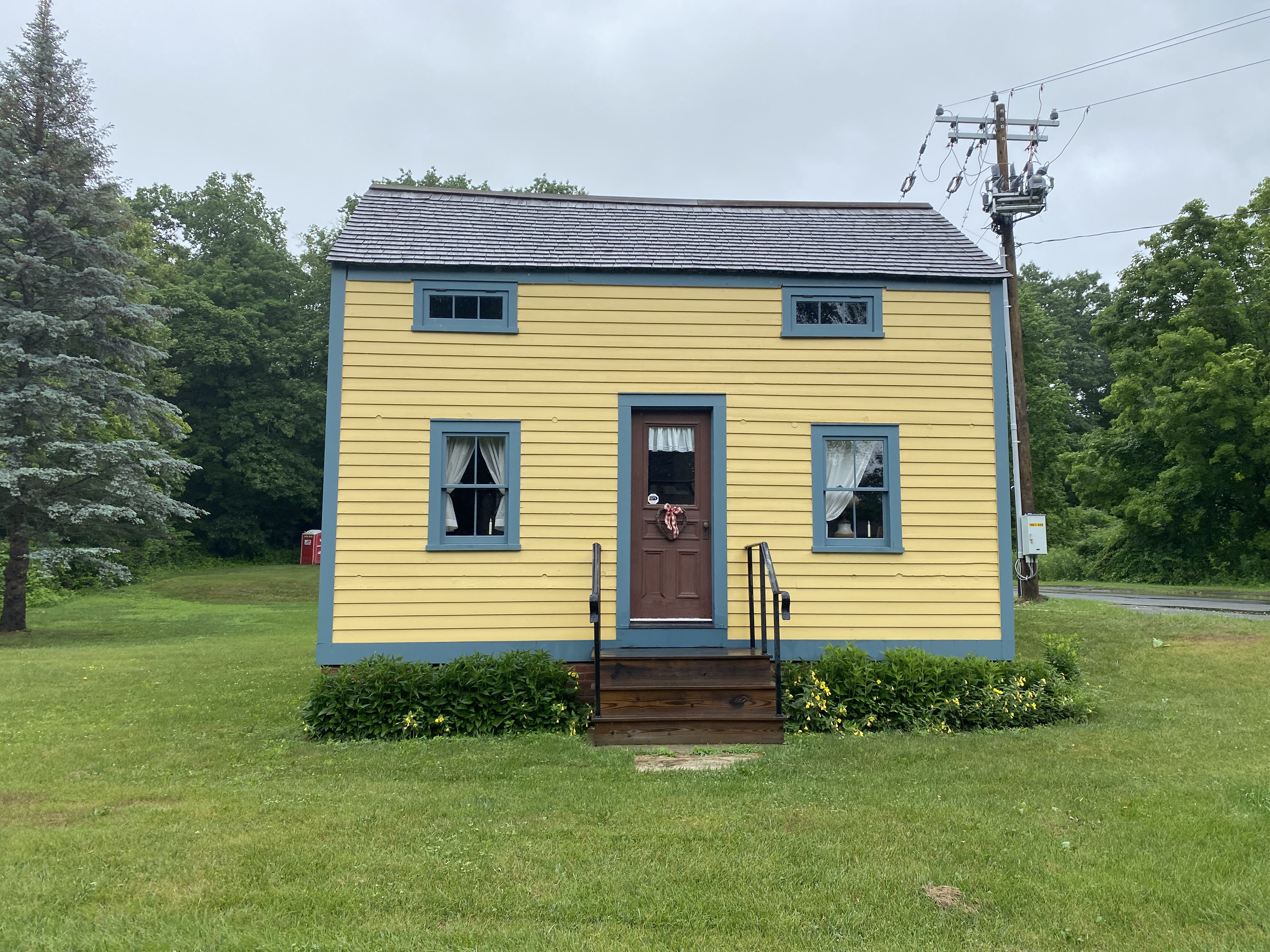
The Fitch-Hoose House, Dalton, Massachusetts

== See also ==
- National Register of Historic Places listings in Berkshire County, Massachusetts
