= Elmer Livingston MacRae =

American painter

Elmer MacRae
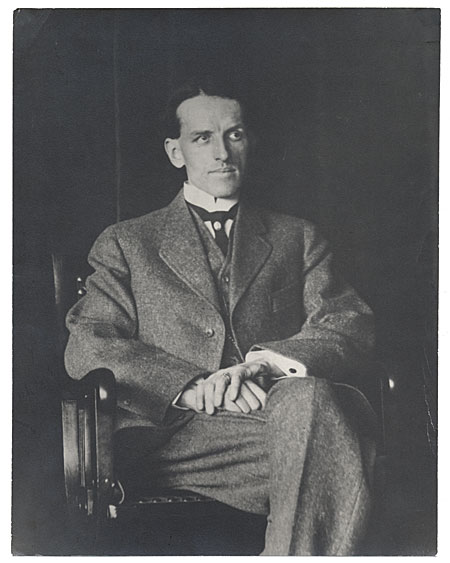
- Elmer L. Mac Rae, ca. 1893, from the Archives of American Art
- Born: July 16, 1875; New York, New York
- Died: April 2, 1953 (aged 77); Greenwich, Connecticut
- Movement: Impressionism, Modernism
- Spouse: Emma Constant (née Holley) MacRae

Elmer Livingston MacRae (1875–1953) was an American visual artist known for his paintings, pastels, and sketches, and for his role as a leading member of the Cos Cob Art Colony, in Greenwich, Connecticut. MacRae was one of the organizers of the influential 1913 Armory Show in New York; he was also instrumental in founding the American Pastel Society (serving as its first secretary-treasurer), as well as the Greenwich Society of Artists.

== Biography ==
Elmer MacRae was born in New York City in 1875. He studied at the Art Students League of New York with Robert Frederick Blum, John Henry Twachtman, H. Siddons Mowbray and James Carroll Beckwith.

In the summer of 1896, when he was 20 years old, he visited Cos Cob for a class in outdoor painting. While there, he fell in love with Emma Constant Holley, the daughter of the owner of the Holley House, where artists usually stayed during their summer seasons at the community. MacRae continued living in New York City and coming to Cos Cob to take classes from co-founder John Henry Twachtman. He moved to the Holley House in 1899, and married Emma on October 17, 1900. She gave birth to twin girls, Constant and Clarissa, on October 31, 1904.

MacRae lived at Holley House for the duration of his career. He succeeded Twachtman as head the Cos Cob colony, and for two decades Elmer and Emma continued to run the boardinghouse, which served to host artists and writers while also serving as a studio and showcase for MacRae's works. Elmer MacRae was a committed suffragist and donated one of his paintings to support the Greenwich Equal Suffrage League. He also designed the badge for the National Junior Suffrage Corps.

He died on April 2, 1953, in Cos Cob.

== Artistic career ==
MacRae was primarily a realist painter influenced by impressionism and Japonism in his early work. His wife and two daughters were frequent subjects for his works, as well as floral studies and landscapes inspired by the Cos Cob area.

His floral studies in particular showcase techniques and stylistic choices popular in Japan. MacRae learned Japanese-style brushwork from Genjiro Yeto, a Japanese artist and fellow student who frequented the Cos Cob art colony. He was encouraged to pursue flowers as a subject by his wife, who was known as a talented authority on the art of flower arrangement.

In 1910, MacRae joined the group of artists known as the Pastellists. In 1911, he became part of the American Association of Painters and Sculptors (AAPS), the group responsible for planning the 1913 Armory Show exhibition. He served as the Association's treasurer.

The modernism that came to prominence after the Armory Show made an impact on MacRae's style. By 1915, his work shows a movement away from impressionism and towards modernism, as his preferred subject of flowers became simplified, with stronger shapes and bolder colors.

MacRae exhibited in New York and Connecticut throughout his career; a posthumous retrospective of his work was held at the Milch Gallery in New York City in 1959.
