= Virginia Watson =

American cultural anthropologist

- Born: Virginia Drew; June 17, 1918; Tomah, Wisconsin
- Died: December 7, 2007 (aged 89)
- Education: University of Wisconsin–Madison; University of Chicago
- Known for: Cultural anthropology
- Spouse: James Bennett Watson
- Children: 2
- Scientific career
- Workplaces: University of Oklahoma; Washington University in St. Louis

Virginia Drew Watson (June 17, 1918 – December 7, 2007) was an American cultural anthropologist who conducted fieldwork among the indigenous Guarani-Kaiowás people of Mato Grosso do Sul, Brazil and the Tairora and Gadsup tribes in the Eastern Highlands of Papua New Guinea. Watson also conducted archaeological research, analyzing 25,000 artifacts excavated by J. David Cole and publishing her findings with Cole in Prehistory of the Eastern Highlands of New Guinea.

== Early life and education ==
Virginia Drew was born in Tomah, Wisconsin on June 17, 1918 to Frances Henry and Eunice (née Williams) Drew. She began conducting fieldwork in the central and southwestern United States in 1939, and in 1940 earned a Ph.B. (Bachelor of Philosophy) in Sociology from the University of Wisconsin–Madison. She went on to obtain an M.A. from the University of Chicago in 1943. Her Master's thesis was titled, "An Analysis of Cooperative Labor in Middle America." Also, while a graduate student in 1942, Watson served as a part-time Lecturer at the Field Museum of Natural History in Chicago.

Watson married James Bennett Watson in 1943. James Watson received his B.A. in anthropology from the University of Chicago in 1941, along with his M.A. and Ph.D. in anthropology in 1945 and 1948. Virginia and James Watson had two children, James Bennett Watson and Anne Thaxter Watson. In his doctoral dissertation titled "Cayuá Culture Change: A Study in Acculturation and Methodology", James Watson thanks his wife who "has given generously of her time at every stage of research and writing and of her first-hand knowledge of the Taquapiri group."

== Fieldwork among the Guaranti-Kaiowá ==
In 1943, Watson and her husband traveled to Brazil where she conducted ethnographic research among the indigenous Guaranti-Kaiowá people of Mato Grosso do Sul, Brazil. The Guaranti-Kaiowá people were identified by the name “Cayua” in her research, which is a name used by the Europeans to identify the indigenous Guarani-Kaiowá people but is not used today.

Her husband, James Watson, served as an assistant professor at the Escala Livre de Sociologia e Politica in São Paulo from 1944 to 1945, while Watson worked as a clerk in the Cultural Relations Department at the American Consulate General in São Paulo, Brazil. When returning from the field, Virginia and James Watson stopped at an archaeological site in the Ciudad Real del Guayra to conduct research, leading to Watson's publication, “Ciudad Real: A Guaraní-Spanish Site on the Alto Parana River,” in 1947.

== Anthropological research career ==
After Virginia and James Watson returned from Brazil, they moved to University of Oklahoma for one year where Virginia Watson supervised archaeological students in sorting and organizing the university collection and supervising students in the field. Watson wrote a report on archaeological reconnaissance in the Canton Reservoir area for the Blaine and Dewey counties in Oklahoma in 1947 as well as another report on the Wister Reservoir in the same year.

Virginia Watson conducted research within Arts and Sciences at Washington University in St. Louis but was only listed as faculty at the university for one year in the Art and Archaeology department because she had not yet obtained her Ph.D. while working there in the late 1940s. While working in the Art and Archaeology Department, Watson analyzed eight copper Southeastern Ceremonial Cult embossed plates, called the “Wulfing Plates.” These copper plates were excavated in 1907 and purchased by J. Max Wulfing for donation to Washington University in St. Louis.

Watson published her research in 1950 in an article titled, “The Wulfing Plates – Products of Prehistoric Americans.” John L. Cotter from the National Park Service describes this publication as “the first detailed study of the Wulfing plates” including studies of the plate contents. Watson included ethno-historical data with early missionary reports. Cotter noted that “Mrs. Watson’s painstaking analysis and well-developed comparative summary represent a substantial contribution to research on ceremonial trait influences reaching the United States area from Meso-America" [9]. When Watson published this research, she was associated with the Sociology-Anthropology Department at Washington University although not listed as a faculty member of the department.

After conducting research on the Wulfing plates, Virginia Watson served as a lecturer at Washington University in St. Louis, Missouri from 1948 to 1953 and supervised students conducting fieldwork. Her husband, James Watson, served as an associate professor at Washington University in St. Louis from 1947 to 1955. During her time working as a lecturer in St. Louis, Virginia and James Watson spent the summers of 1949 and 1950 in Del Norte, Colorado conducting community surveys related to jobs, business, cultural attitudes, and education, which was part of a larger study related to social stratification between English-speaking and Spanish-speaking residents of the Anglo-Spanish community in Colorado.

== Professional career ==
Virginia and James Watson moved to Washington for James Watson's new appointment as full professor of anthropology at the University of Washington in 1955. From 1957 to 1963, Watson worked as a lecturer at Seattle University and from 1961 to 1971, served as an Occasional Lecturer at the University of Washington, Seattle. She served as an Affiliate Curator at the Thomas A. Burke Museum at the University of Washington from 1969 to 1989 while her husband served as a professor at the Department of Anthropology from 1955 to 1987. While working as an affiliate curator, Virginia Watson wrote one of the first reports on the Prehistory of the Eastern Papua New Guinea Highlands.

Watson served as a Fellow of the American Anthropological Association and the Royal Anthropological Institute and was actively corresponding with fellow anthropologists. From 1989 to 2001, Watson also corresponded with well-known female archaeologists and anthropologists, including Jacquetta Hawkes and Margaret Mead.

Watson's work has been criticized because of her lack of long-term academic appointments. Anthropologist Laura Zimmer-Tamakoshi criticized Watson's failure to tackle contemporary theoretical issues as a result of her failure to work with anthropology students, stating that “the fact that Watson never taught or worked with anthropology students … suggest a possible unfamiliarity with disinclination to tackle contemporary cultural anthropology and theory in either Papua New Guinea studies or more generally." Watson did actively supervise students on archaeological research but was not affiliated with Washington University in St. Louis because she had not received her Ph.D. and only worked directly with the Burkell Museum at the University of Washington while her husband served as a professor of anthropology.

== Later life ==
After Watson retired, she spent most of her winters in Florida and her summers in Boulder, Colorado. Virginia Drew Watson died on December 7, 2007. She was survived by her husband, James Watson, who died in 2009. The Virginia Drew Watson papers are housed at the National Anthropological Archives. Watson's papers include correspondence, fieldnotes, manuscripts, photographs, reports, maps, and slides. Most correspondence is with colleagues conducting similar research in museums and universities in the United States and Australia. The collection includes field notes from Brazil as well as Tairora, Agarabi, and Gadsup groups in Highland Papua New Guinea.

== Selected bibliography ==
- 1940 “Delving into Pueblo ruins.” The Anchora 56: 14–151.
- 1944 "Notas sobre o sistema de parentesco dos Índios Cayuá." Sociologia 6, no. 1: 31–48.
- 1947 “Ciudad Real: A Guarani-Spanish site on the alto Parana River.” American Antiquity 13: 163–176.
- 1948 “A note on some projectile points from the Kissimme region.” American Antiquity 14: 127–128.
- 1950 “The Optima Focus on the Panhandle Aspect: Description and Analysis.” Bulletin of the Texas Archaeological and Paleontological Society 21: 7-68.
- 1950 The Wulfing Plates: Products of Prehistoric Americans. Vol. 8. Washington University.
- 1950 The optima focus of the Panhandle aspect: Description and analysis. Texas Archeological and Paleontological Society.
- 1955: "Pottery in the eastern highlands of New Guinea." Southwestern Journal of Anthropology 11, no. 2: 121–128.
- 1965 "Agarabi female roles and family structure: a study in sociocultural change." PhD dissertation, University of Chicago, Department of Anthropology, 1965.
- 1972 Batainabura of New Guinea. New Haven: Human Relations Area Files, 1972. (co-authored with James B. Watson)
- 1978 Prehistory of the eastern highlands of New Guinea. Australian National University Press.
- 1993 Watson, Virginia Drew. "Adzera and Agarabi: contrastive ceramics in Papua New Guinea." The Journal of the Polynesian Society 102, no. 3: 305–318.
- 1995 Watson, Virginia Drew. "Simple and significant: Stone tool production in Highland New Guinea." Lithic Technology: 89–99.
- 1997 Anyan’s Story: A New Guinea Woman in Two Worlds. Seattle: University of Washington Press.
