= Mina Fonda Ochtman =

American painter

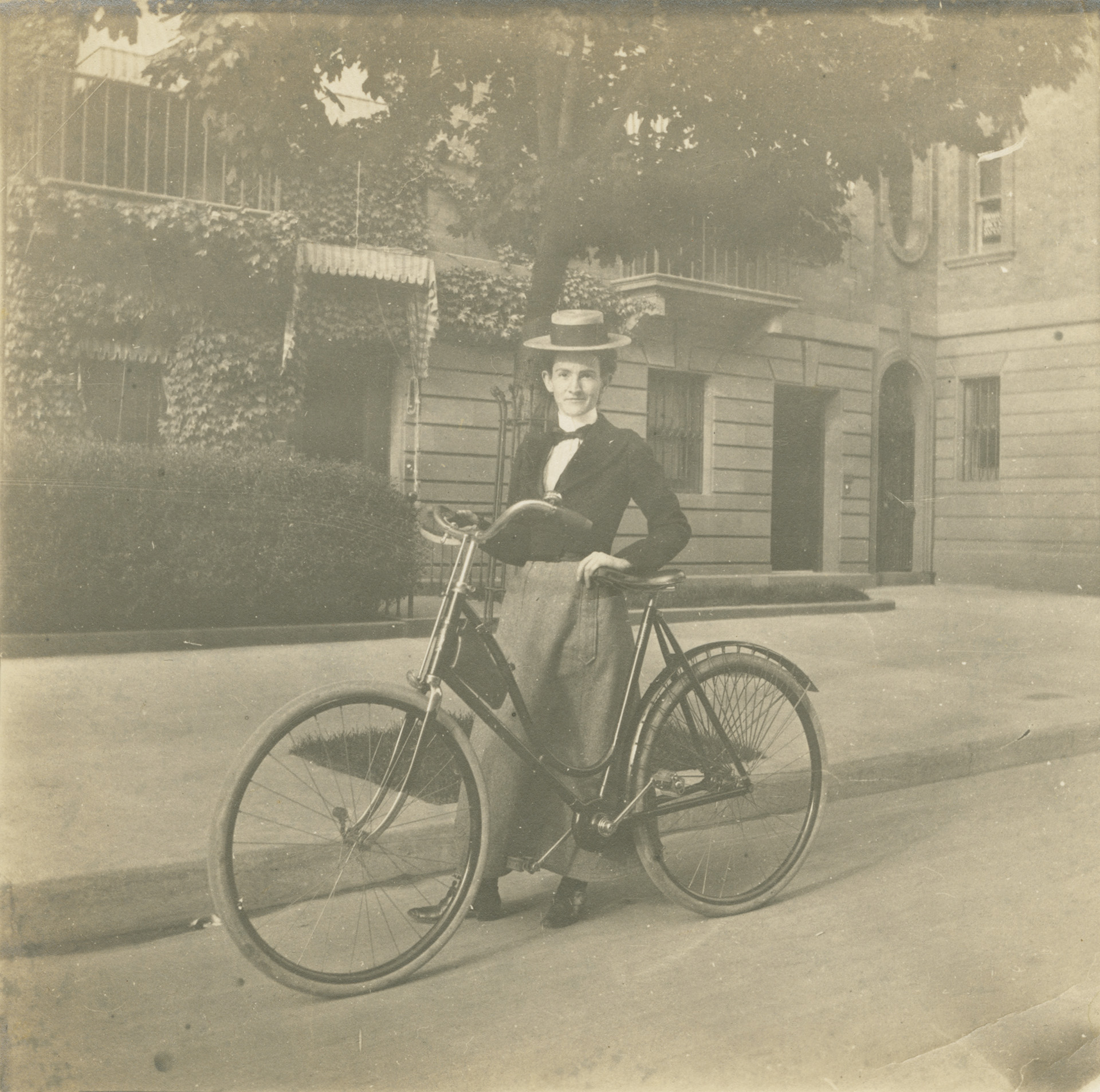
- Mina Fonda Ochtman, c.1888-1891, silver print, Department of Image Collections, National Gallery of Art Library, Washington, DC
- Born: 1862
- Died: 1924 (aged 61–62)
- Education: Art Students League of New York
- Known for: Watercolor
- Movement: Impressionism
- Spouse: Leonard Ochtman

Mina Fonda Ochtman (1862–1924) was an American Impressionist painter noted for her watercolors of landscapes and coastal scenes. She was wife of the artist Leonard Ochtman, and an active member of the Cos Cob Art Colony in Greenwich, Connecticut the early 20th century.

== Life and career ==
Mina Fonda was born on March 28th 1862 in Laconia, New Hampshire. Her mother Catherine Gillette and her father Isaac Fonda both worked as carriage makers. In 1886 she went to New York City to study at the Art Students League of New York with Kenyon Cox.

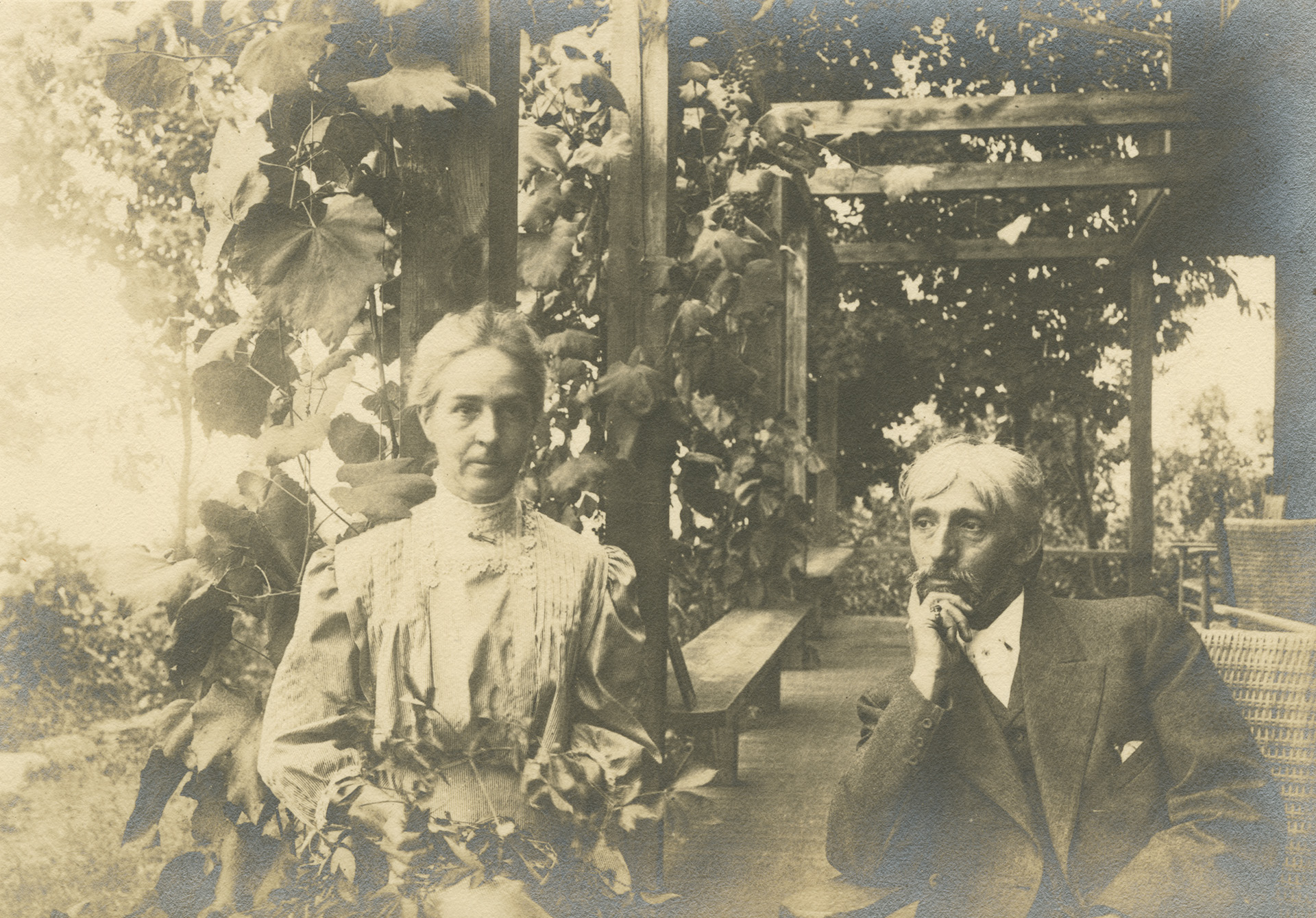
Mina Fonda and Leonard Ochtman, 1906 or 1907

She married Leonard Ochtman in 1891. They settled in Cos Cob and established a summer art school in 1910. Leonard served as the founder and first vice president of the Greenwich Society of Artists in 1912, and served as its president from 1919 to 1932.

The forested home that Leonard and Mina shared was known as "Greyledge," and served as a center of attraction for local artists. Their home and the landscapes which surrounded it are featured in many of their works. They had two children, Dorothy Ochtman Del Mar, who was also an artist, and Leonard Ochtman Jr.

Mina Ochtman was a member of the National Association of Women Artists as well as several watercolor societies.

She died in 1924.
