= Dorothy Ochtman =

American painter

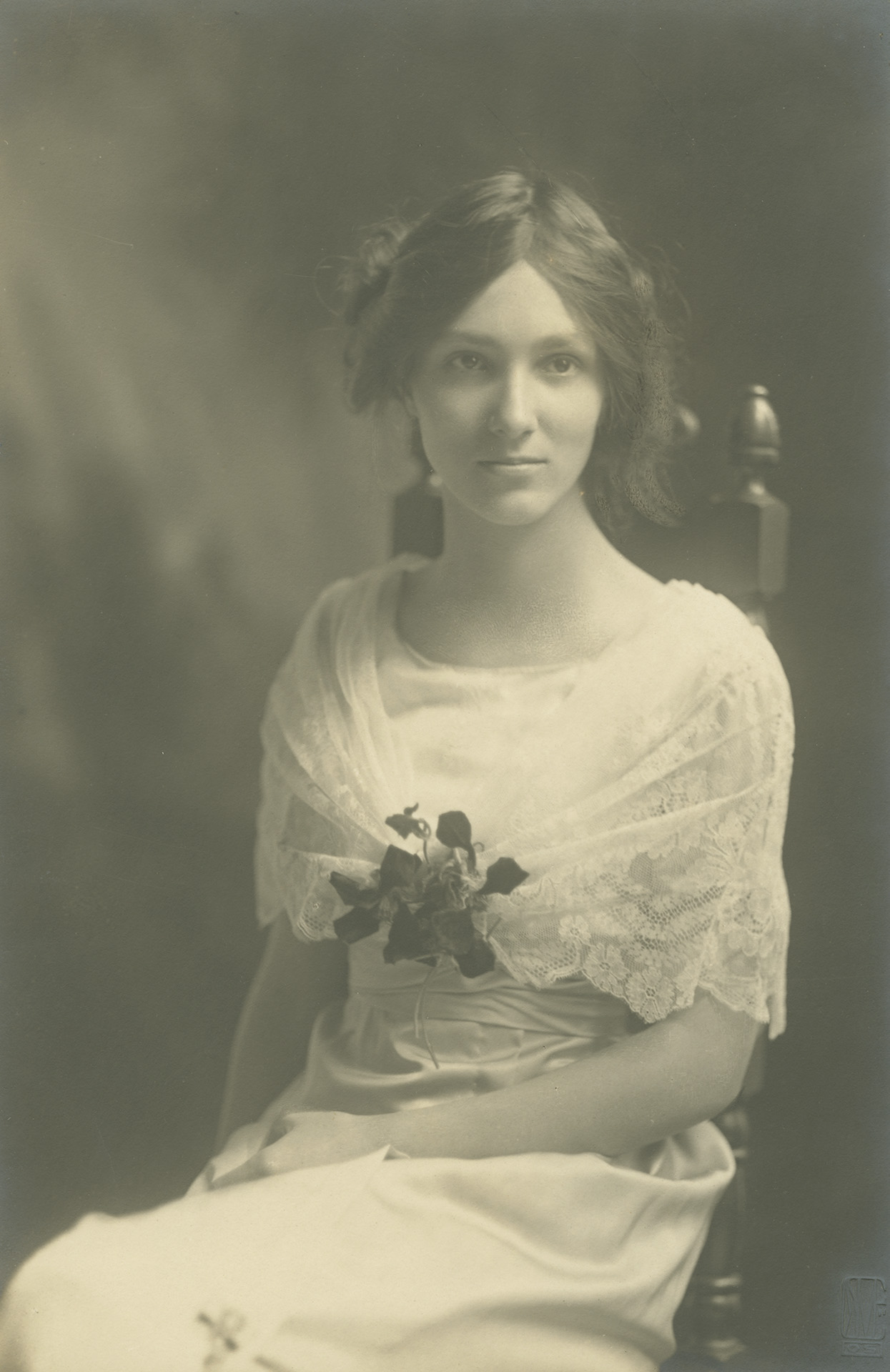
- Dorothy Ochtman, c.1910-1914, matte silver gelatin print, Department of Image Collections, National Gallery of Art Library, Washington, DC
- Born: 1892
- Died: 1971 (aged 78–79)
- Occupation: Painter

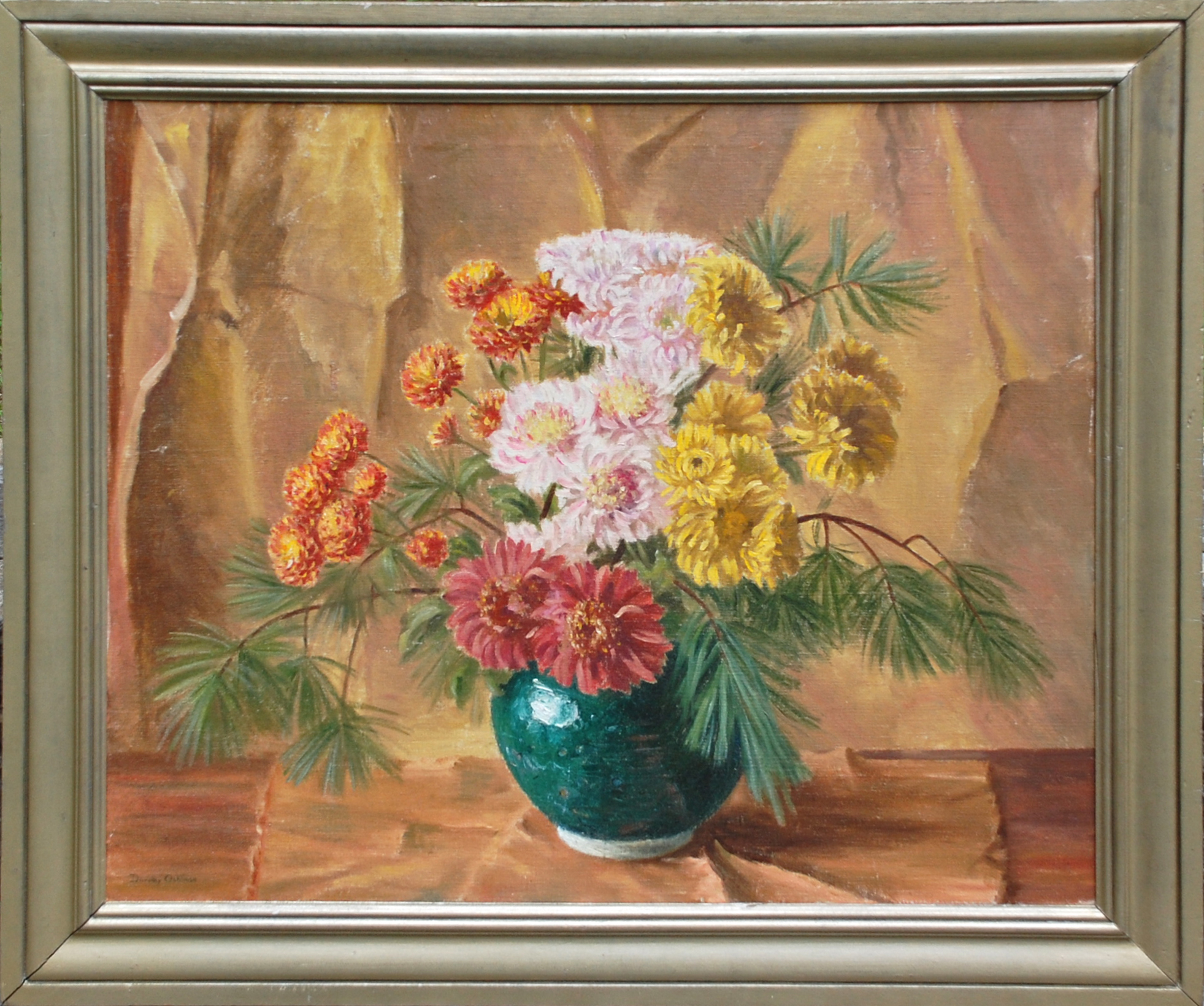
Chrysanthemums by Dorothy Ochtman

Dorothy Ochtman (March 8, 1892 - April 26, 1971) was an American painter.

Daughter of the Dutch-born painter Leonard Ochtman and his wife, Mina, Ochtman was born in Riverside, Connecticut, and probably had her earliest instruction from her parents. She received a degree from Smith College in 1914, and performed her graduate studies at Bryn Mawr College; she also attended the school of the National Academy of Design from 1916 until 1919. A Guggenheim Fellowship allowed her to study in Fontainebleau at the École Americaine des Beaux-Arts, and from 1927 to 1928 she was at the Académie Despujols. She showed in many annual exhibitions at the National Academy, beginning in 1918 and ending in 1950; she won prizes in 1921 and 1924, becoming an associate member in 1929, and becoming a full member in the year of her death. She also showed three times at the Corcoran Gallery of Art, and her work was included in many other exhibits throughout her career. She married an electrical engineer, William A. DelMar, in 1945. In later years she lived in Greenwich, Connecticut, where she died.

Stylistically, Ochtman worked in a post-Impressionist style. Her work consisted largely of flower pieces, still-lifes, and portraits. She was represented by the Grand Central Art Galleries for much of her career.

Her work is in the collections of the Smith College Museum of Art and the National Academy of Design, among others. The Academy collection also contains a portrait of her by Ivan Olinsky.
