= John Henry Twachtman =

American impressionist painter (1853–1902)

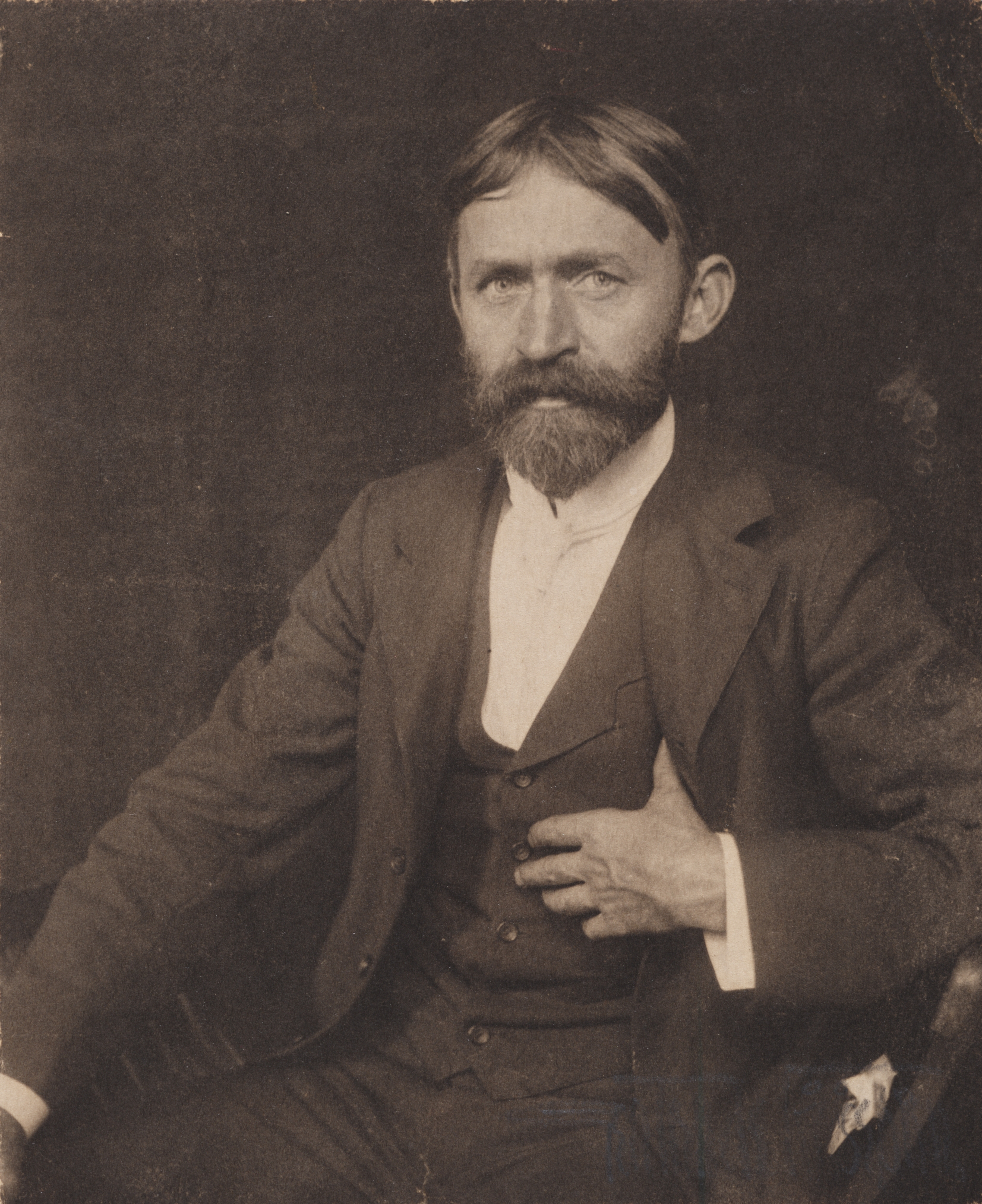
- Twachtman, c. 1900. Photo by Gertrude Käsebier
- Born: August 4, 1853; Cincinnati, Ohio, US
- Died: August 8, 1902 (aged 49); Gloucester, Massachusetts, US
- Education: Frank Duveneck; Royal Academy, Munich; Académie Julian, Paris
- Known for: Impressionism, Landscape art

John Henry Twachtman (August 4, 1853 – August 8, 1902) was an American painter best known for his impressionist landscapes, though his painting style varied widely through his career. Art historians consider Twachtman's style of American Impressionism to be among the more personal and experimental of his generation. He was a member of "The Ten," a loosely-allied group of American artists dissatisfied with professional art organizations, who banded together in 1898 to exhibit their works as a stylistically unified group.

== Studies ==
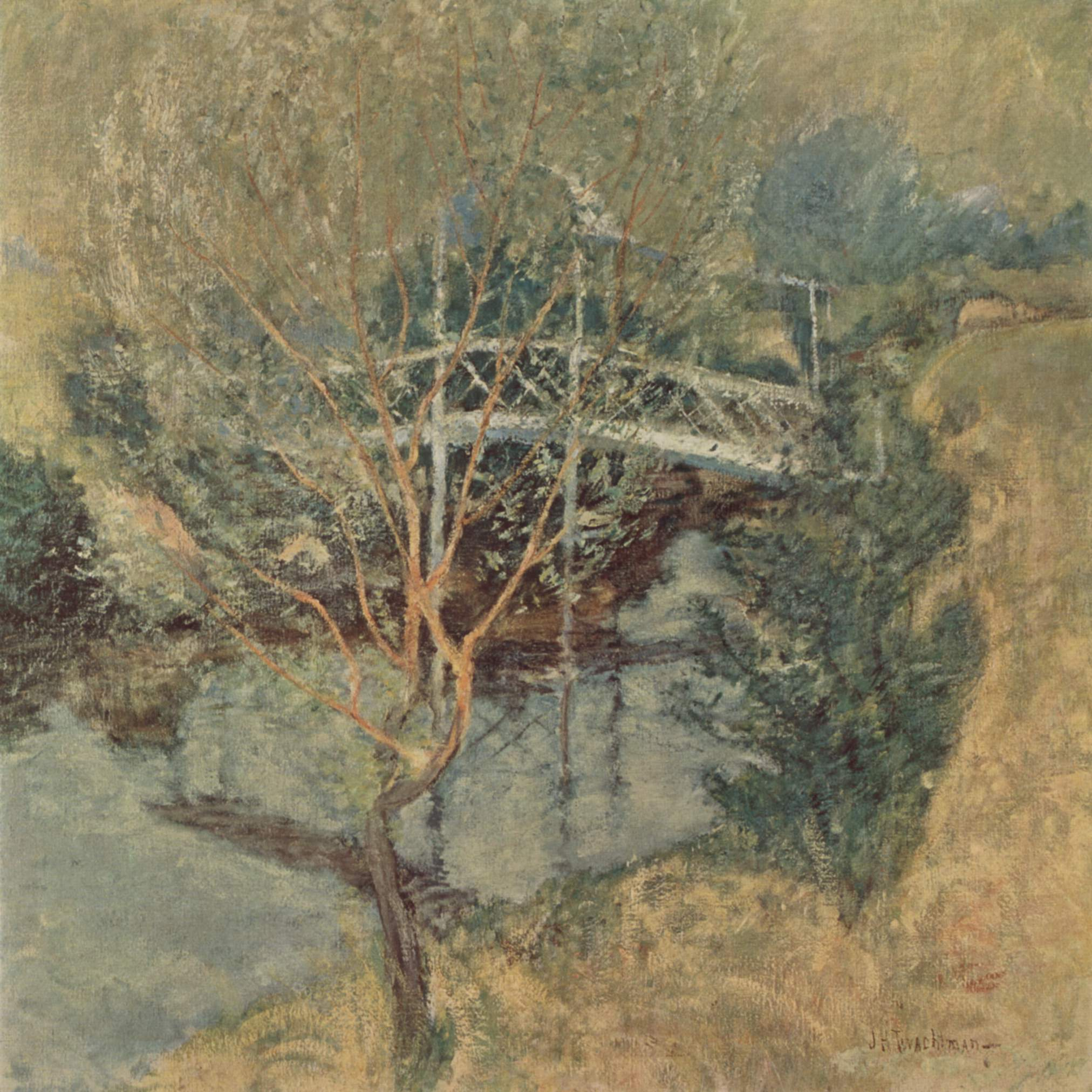
The White Bridge, ca. 1895, Minneapolis Institute of Arts

Twachtman was born in Cincinnati, Ohio and received his first art training there, including studying under Frank Duveneck. Like many other gifted and driven artists of his generation, including Henry Ossawa Tanner and Diego Rivera, he sought his training in Europe. He enrolled in the Academy of Fine Arts in Munich in 1875 and visited Venice with Duveneck and William Merritt Chase in 1878. His landscapes from this time exhibit the loosely brushed, shadowy technique taught at Munich. Twachtman also learned etching, and sometimes carried etching plates with him that he could use to spontaneously record a scene.

After a brief return to America, Twachtman studied from 1883 to 1885 at the Académie Julian in Paris, and his paintings dramatically shifted towards a soft, gray and green tonalist style. During this time he painted what some art historians consider to be his greatest masterpieces, including Arques-la-Bataille, in the collection of the Metropolitan Museum of Art in New York, and Springtime, in the collection of the Cincinnati Art Museum.

== Later life ==
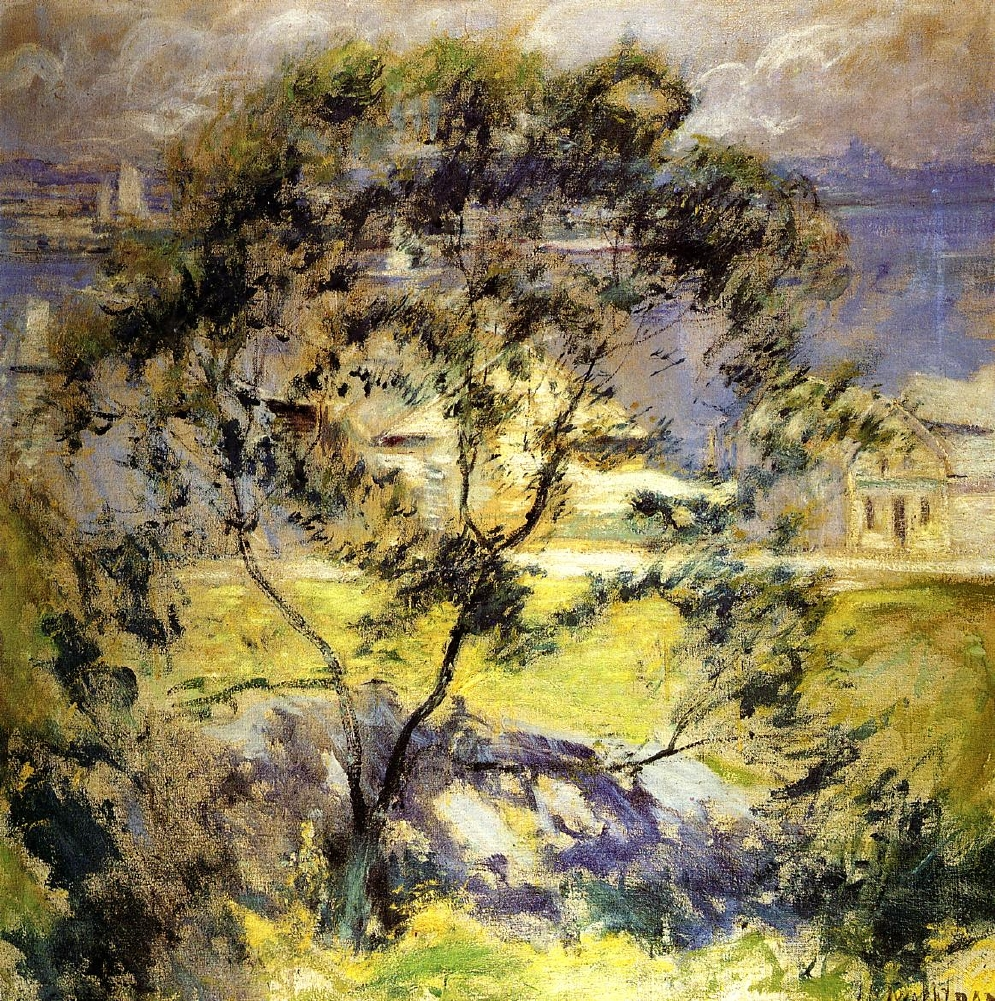
Wild Cherry Tree, oil on canvas, c. 1901, Albright-Knox Art Gallery

In 1886 he returned to America. In 1890, he bought a farm in Greenwich. He often painted and exhibited with fellow artist Julian Alden Weir, and spent considerable time at the art colony in Cos Cob. His presence was vital to the colony, says art historian Susan G. Larkin:

"Twachtman's temperament—by turns gregarious and introspective, restless and serene—was a major factor in preventing the Cos Cob art colony from becoming a backwater of nostalgic complacency. Ironically, his lack of commercial success contributed to his artistic independence, freeing him from the temptation of producing salable pictures according to a proven formula. His art, conversation, and teaching fueled the creative fires of his friends and students in Cos Cob."

In addition to his oil paintings, Twachtman produced drawings in pastel. He taught painting at the Art Students League from 1889 until his death in 1902. Twachtman was close friends with Julian Alden Weir and the two often painted together.

In Connecticut his painting style shifted again, this time to a highly personal impressionist technique. Twachtman painted many landscapes of his farm and garden in Greenwich, often depicting the snow-covered landscape. He executed dozens of paintings of a small waterfall on his property, capturing the scene in different seasons and times of day. In the summers of 1900–1902, Twachtman visited Gloucester, Massachusetts, another center of artistic activity in the era, and produced a series of vibrant scenes that anticipated a more modernist style yet to gain prominence in American art.

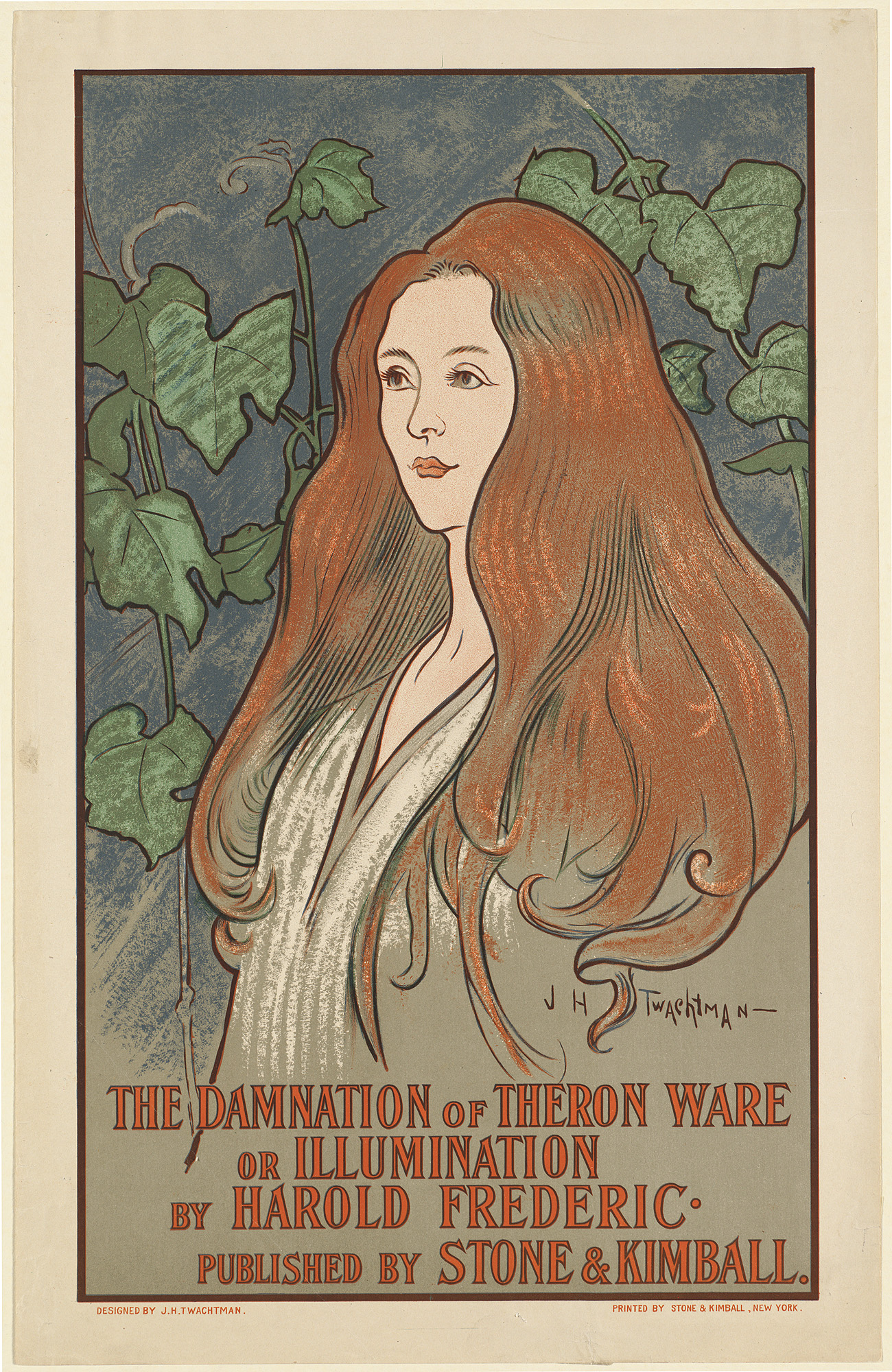
1890s American Art Poster lithograph

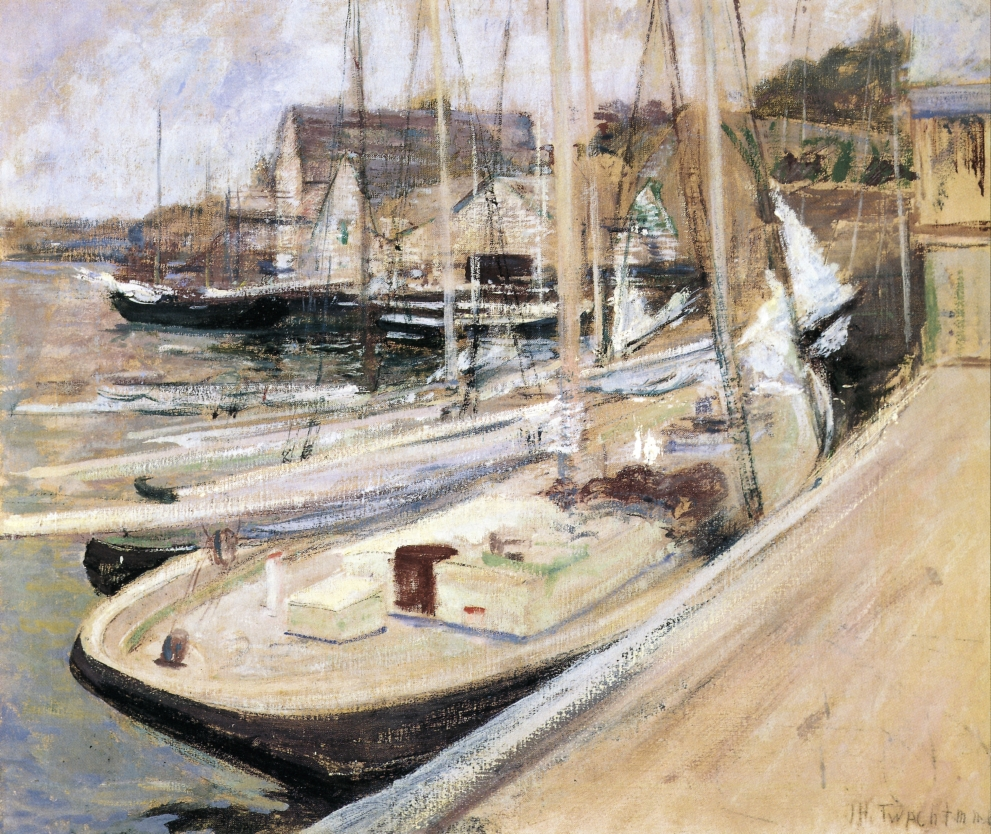
Fishing Boats at Gloucester, 1901, Smithsonian Museum of American Art

Twachtman died of a brain aneurysm on August 8, 1902, aged 49, at Addison Gilbert Hospital in Gloucester, Massachusetts. His works are in many museum collections including the Metropolitan Museum of Art, New York City; the National Gallery of Art, Washington, D.C.; and the Museum of Fine Arts, Boston.

== See also ==
- Art Students League
- Ten American Painters
- Society of American Artists
