= Red Bridge =

Red Bridge may refer to:

== Structures ==
- Red Bridge (border), on the border between Georgia and Azerbaijan
- Red Bridge, Yerevan, Armenia
- Red Bridge (Tasmania), Australia
- Félix-Gabriel-Marchand Bridge (known locally as the Red Bridge), Mansfield-et-Pontefract, Quebec, Canada
- Grand Duchess Charlotte Bridge, in Luxembourg City, Luxembourg, more commonly known as the Red Bridge owing to its distinctive colour
- Red Bridge (Saint Petersburg), Russia
- Red Bridge (Chernihiv), Ukraine
- Red Bridge (Kamloops), British Columbia

=== United States ===
- Red Bridge (Meriden, Connecticut), NRHP-listed
- Red Bridge (Monroe, Iowa), NRHP-listed
- Red Bridge (Postville, Iowa), NRHP-listed
- Red Bridge (Silverton, Washington), listed on the NRHP in Snohomish County, Washington
- Covered Bridge (Cedarburg, Wisconsin), originally Red Bridge, NRHP-listed
- Old Red Bridge, in Franklin County, Massachusetts
- Red Bridge (Rhode Island) or Henderson Bridge, between Providence and East Providence
- Red Bridge, over Wissahickon Creek in Pennsylvania
- Red Bridge Hydro (Wilbraham, Massachusetts)

== Other uses ==
- The Red Bridge, an 1895 painting by Julian Alden Weir
- Hongqiao District (meaning "Red Bridge"), a district in Tianjin, China

== See also ==
- Redbridge (disambiguation)
- Red Boardwalk Bridge, Thailand
