= Redbridge =

Redbridge may refer to:

== Places ==
- London Borough of Redbridge, England
  - Redbridge, London, a place in that borough
  - Redbridge (electoral division), Greater London Council
  - Redbridge tube station
- Redbridge, Kansas City, a neighborhood in South Kansas City, Missouri, USA
- Redbridge, Southampton, England, a suburb
  - Redbridge railway station
- Redbridge, Ontario, Canada
- Redbridge, Oxford, England, a suburb

== Other ==
- A gluten-free beer; see Anheuser-Busch brands § Others
- Redbridge F.C., a football club in the London Borough of Redbridge
- Redbridge Group, an Australian political consultancy firm founded by Kos Samaras

== See also ==
- Red Bridge (disambiguation)
