= Ten American Painters =

Group of artists formed in 1898

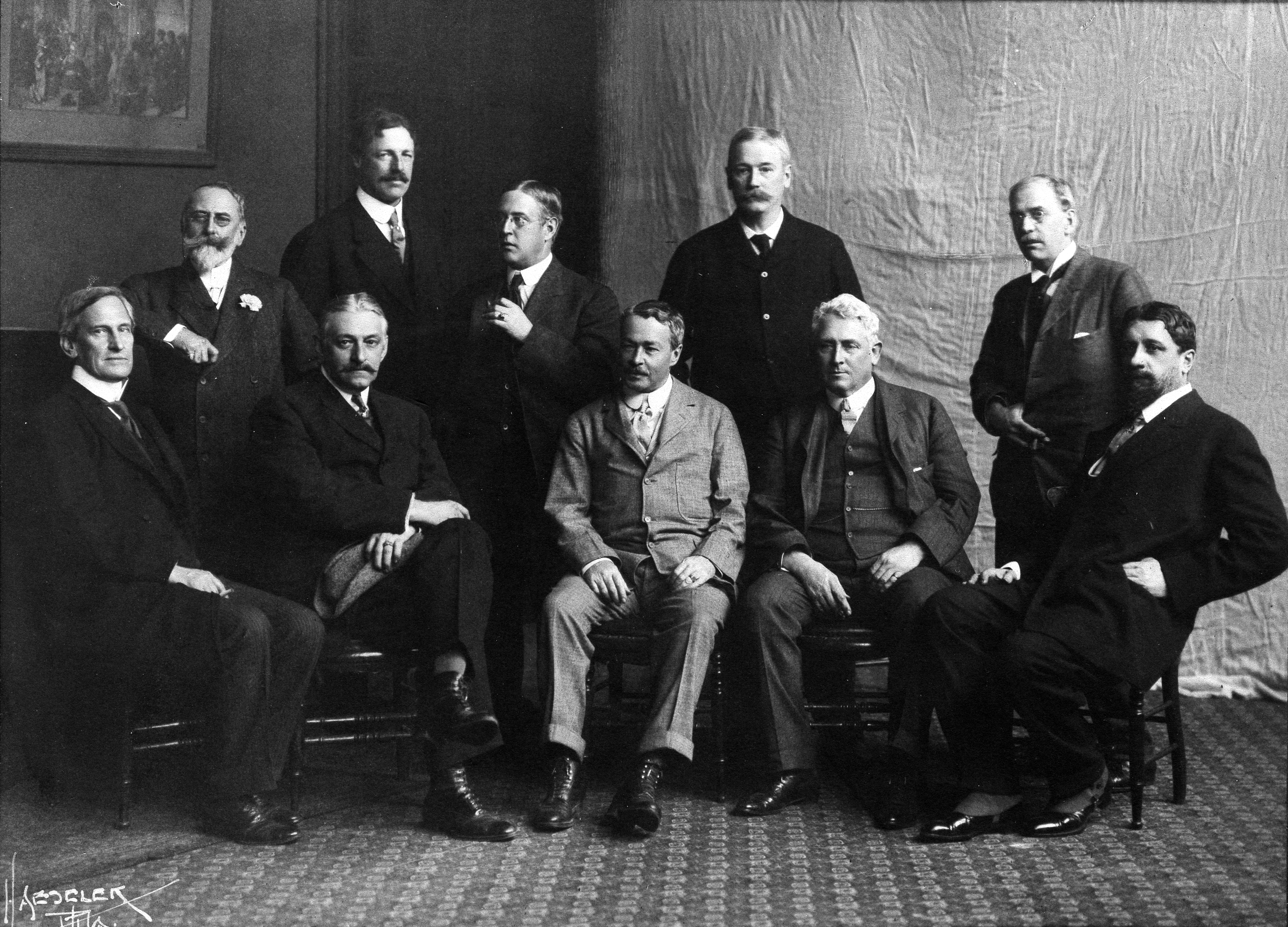
The Ten in 1908

The Ten American Painters (also known as The Ten) was an artists' group formed in 1898 to exhibit their work as a unified group. John Henry Twachtman, J. Alden Weir, and Childe Hassam were the driving forces behind the organization. Dissatisfied with the conservatism of the American art establishment, the three artists recruited seven others from Boston, New York City, and elsewhere on the East Coast of the United States, with the intention of creating an exhibition society that valued their view of originality, imagination, and exhibition quality. The Ten achieved popular and critical success, and lasted two decades before dissolving.

== Foundation ==
In America, popular painting styles usually originated on the east coast in cities like New York and Boston. The Ten continued a tradition of artists forming new groups in reaction to a lack of support from existing artists' groups. Thus, the National Academy of Design (founded in 1825 by students dissatisfied by the conservatism of the older American Academy of the Fine Arts) eventually became too conservative to suit the artists who in 1877 initiated the Society of American Artists so they could meet and exhibit their work as a collective. The Ten American Painters was born from this group in 1898, when Twachtman, Weir, and Hassam found the Society hostile to the Impressionist style they had adopted. Leaving the group was considered a bold move by the general public, but the Society of American Artists felt that it was easier to let the members that were leaving go than appease them.

== Impressionism ==
Impressionism was a French art movement that emerged in the 1870s, and was picked up by American painters towards the end of the 19th century. Painters like Edgar Degas, Claude Monet and Auguste Renoir are generally considered the masters of the impressionist movement. An Impressionist painting will often use small dabs of color in order to make the painting distinguishable from afar, but indistinguishable from up close.

== Members ==
The founding members of The Ten were Frank W. Benson, Joseph Rodefer DeCamp, Thomas Wilmer Dewing, Childe Hassam, Willard Leroy Metcalf, Robert Reid, Edward Simmons, Edmund C. Tarbell, John Henry Twachtman, and J. Alden Weir. All were former members of the Society of American Artists. Winslow Homer declined an invitation to join the group; Abbott Handerson Thayer accepted membership but withdrew before the group's first exhibition. After J. H. Twachtman died in 1902, William Merritt Chase joined in his place. Unanimous approval was required to admit a new member to the society. It was also decided that there would never be less than ten members active for the group to remain as one.

For twenty years The Ten exhibited in New York, Boston, Philadelphia, and other American cities. After this it dissolved due to death in its ranks and lack of public interest.
