= The Ice Cutters =

Painting by J. Alden Weir

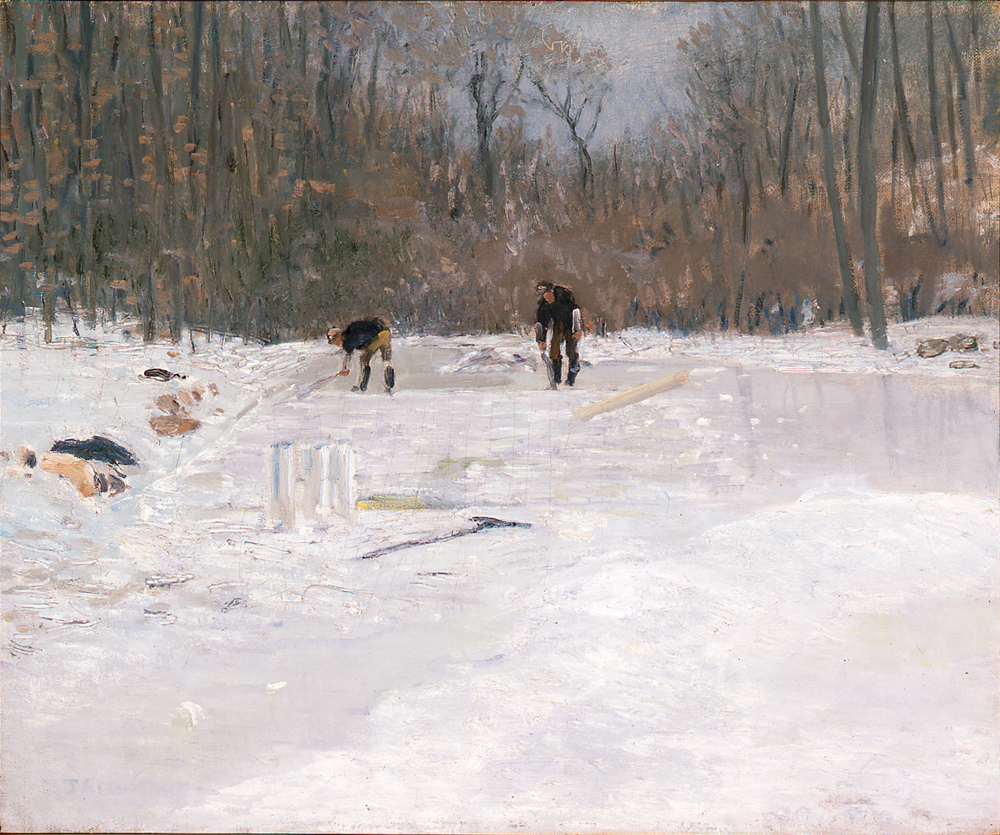
- Artist: J. Alden Weir
- Year: 1895
- Location: Portland Art Museum, Portland, Oregon, U.S.

The Ice Cutters is an 1895 painting by J. Alden Weir, and part of the collection of the Portland Art Museum in Portland, Oregon, in the United States.

== See also ==
- 1895 in art
- List of works by J. Alden Weir
