= J. Alden Weir =

American painter (1852–1919)

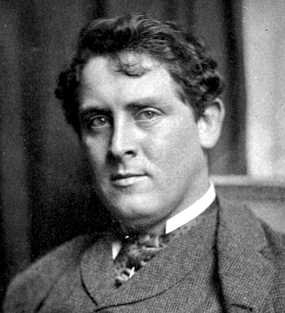
- J. Alden Weir in the late 19th century
- Born: Julian Alden Weir; August 30, 1852; West Point, New York
- Died: December 8, 1919 (aged 67); New York City, US
- Education: National Academy of Design, École des Beaux-Arts, Jean-Léon Gérôme
- Known for: Painting
- Movement: Impressionism

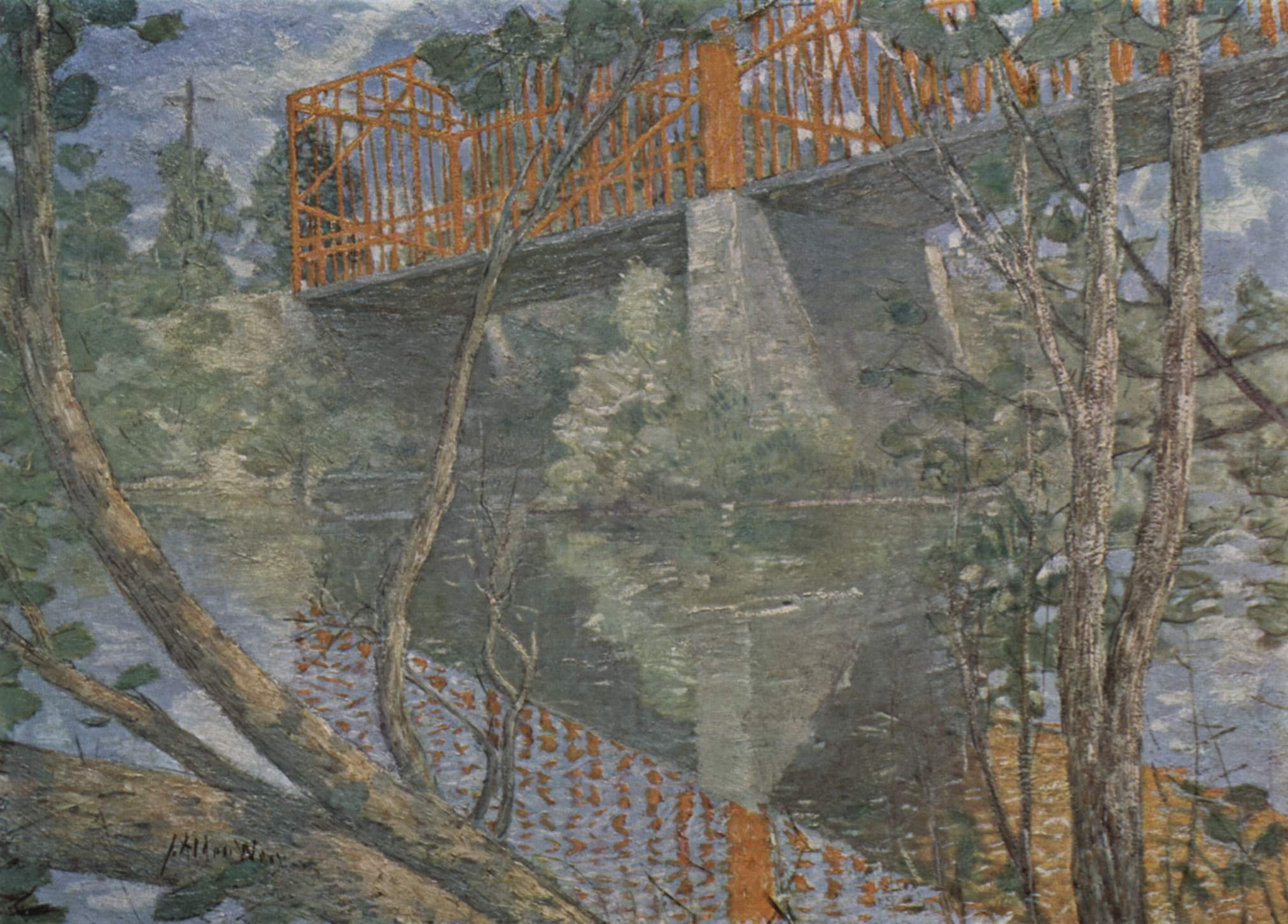
The Red Bridge, c. 1895, Metropolitan Museum of Art

Julian Alden Weir (August 30, 1852 – December 8, 1919) was an American impressionist painter and member of the Cos Cob Art Colony in Greenwich, Connecticut. Weir was also one of the founding members of "The Ten", a loosely allied group of American artists dissatisfied with professional art organizations, who banded together in 1898 to exhibit their works as a stylistically unified group.

== Biography ==
Weir was born on August 30, 1852, the second to last of sixteen children, and raised in West Point, New York. His father was painter Robert Walter Weir, the professor of drawing at the Military Academy at West Point for forty years who taught such luminaries as James Abbott McNeill Whistler, Robert E. Lee and George Armstrong Custer. His older brother, John Ferguson Weir, also became a well-known landscape artist who painted in the styles of the Hudson River and Barbizon schools. He was professor of painting and design at Yale University from 1869, starting the first academic art program on an American campus. His niece was artist and educator Irene Weir.

Julian Weir received his first art training at the National Academy of Design in the early 1870s before enrolling at the École des Beaux-Arts in Paris in 1873. His peers included Finnish painter Albert Edelfelt with whom he shared a studio and would become a lifelong friend. While in France he studied under the famous French artist Jean-Léon Gérôme, and became good friends with Jules Bastien-Lepage. Weir also encountered impressionism for the first time, and reacted strongly. In a April 15, 1877, letter to his parents, he commented, "I never in my life saw more horrible things...They do not observe drawing nor form but give you an impression of what they call nature. It was worse than the Chamber of Horrors." As a conservative academic painter at this stage in his career, Weir was esteemed by his European peers during his training years.

Weir met James McNeill Whistler in London before returning to New York City in 1877. Upon his return to NYC, Weir became a charter member of the Society of American Artists and continued exhibiting his work at the National Academy of Design, where he first displayed his paintings in 1875. He earned wages through portrait commissions and teaching art classes at the Cooper Union Women's Art School, the Art Students League and in private classes.

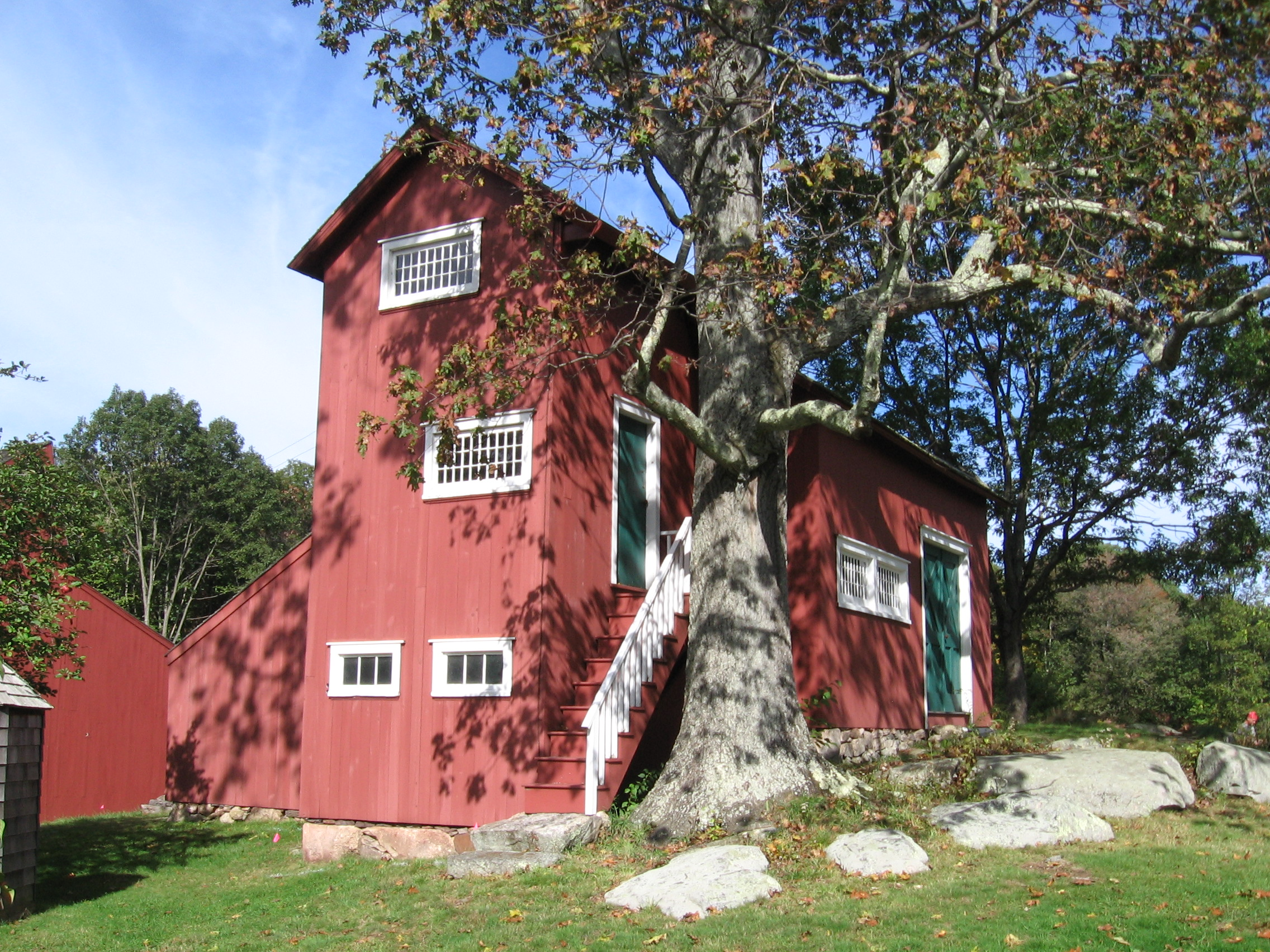
Studio at the Weir Farm National Historic Site

His works as a young artist centered on still life and the human figure, which he rendered in a realist style not unlike the work of Édouard Manet. This was supported by the fact that Weir purchased two paintings by Manet during the summers of 1880 and 1881, Woman with a Parrot and Boy with a Sword, for the New York collector Erwin Davis. It was clear by then that Weir was beginning to lose his previous staunch loathing for French Impressionism.

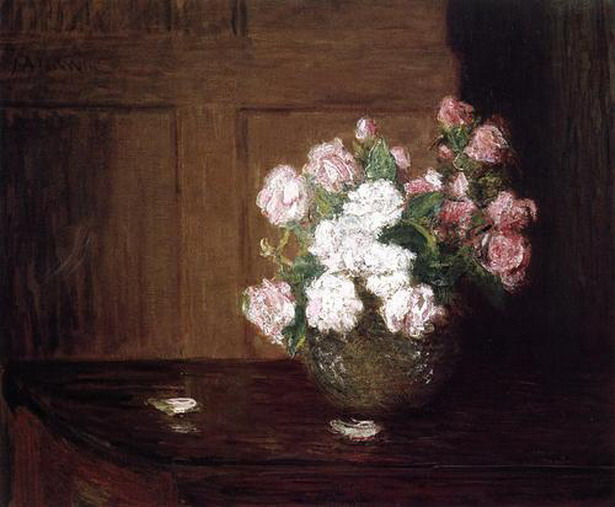
Roses in a Silver Bowl on a Mahogany Table, c. 1890

In the 1880s Weir moved to rural Wilton, Connecticut, after having acquired farm property, now the Weir Farm National Historic Site, through his marriage to Anna Baker in 1883. While here, he strengthened his friendship with artists Albert Pinkham Ryder and John Henry Twachtman. The art of Weir and Twachtman was especially well aligned, and the two sometimes painted and exhibited together. Both taught at the Art Students League. In 1889, the two artists exhibited and sold a large portion of their paintings at Ortgies Gallery in New York. Weir was also close friends with the still life and landscape painter Emil Carlsen who summered with Weir on his farm, before purchasing his own home in Falls Village, Connecticut. The pastoral setting of his farms often feature in his paintings. They were a healthy escape from the hustle and bustle of urban New York City. Weir loved working in the city, but it often became too much for him to bear. Branchville and Windham served as comfortable getaways. According to art historian Hollis Clayson, "Life on the street could often frustrate and aggravate, but contemplated from far off, experienced exclusively as a visual phenomenon, it could satisfy".

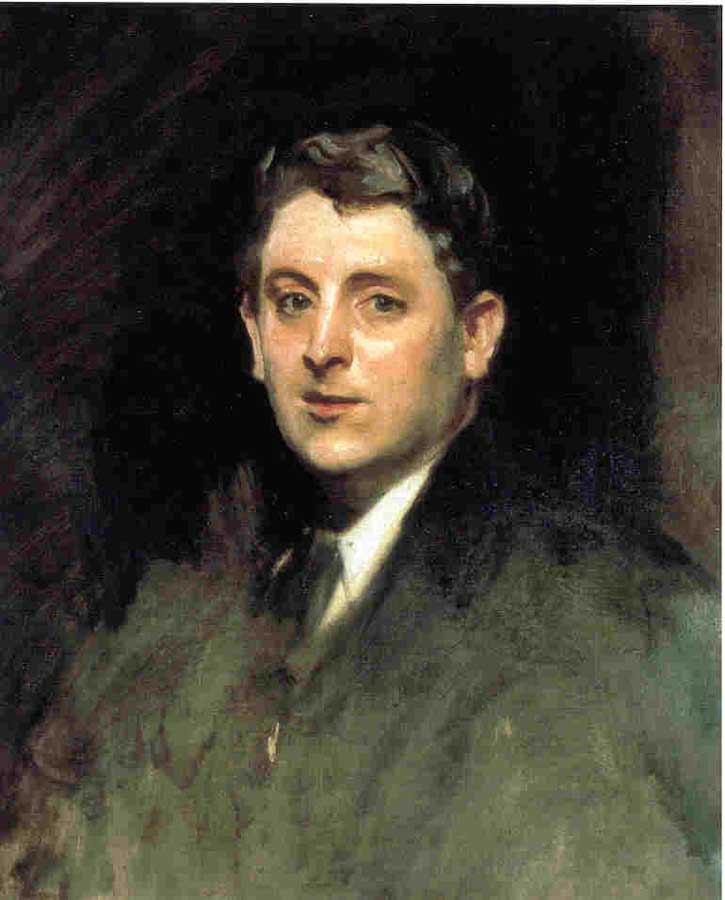
Julian Alden Weir, John Singer Sargent, 1890

By 1891 Weir had reconciled his earlier misgivings about impressionism and adopted the style as his own. His one-man show at the Blakeslee gallery in the same year clearly displayed his newfound affinity for the Impressionist style. His work demonstrated a tendency for a lighter palette of pastel colors and broken brushwork akin to the Impressionists. His wife Anna died in 1892, but Weir remarried her sister, Ella Baker, the same year. By this new marriage, he inherited another farm in Windham, CT. This new site was now his rightful property, but it was not the first time he had ever seen the Windham farm. He had been there with Anna in years past. On his first stop there in 1882, the beautiful farm and surrounding village made quite an impact on him. He had this to say: "This is really the first Connecticut village that I have really ever known, & now I feel that a charm is connected with all villages, such as I have read of but never appreciated"

Weir gained further notoriety and in 1893, the American Art Association grouped his works together with those by Twachtman for a comparative exhibit with pieces done by Claude Monet and Paul Besnard. Such a prestigious event meant that the art world had taken notice of the American brand of Impressionism. Furthermore, Weir felt compassion for those who lost their jobs in the 1893 depression. Railroad bankruptcies led to unemployed workers, but Weir helped raise money for them with painting exhibitions.

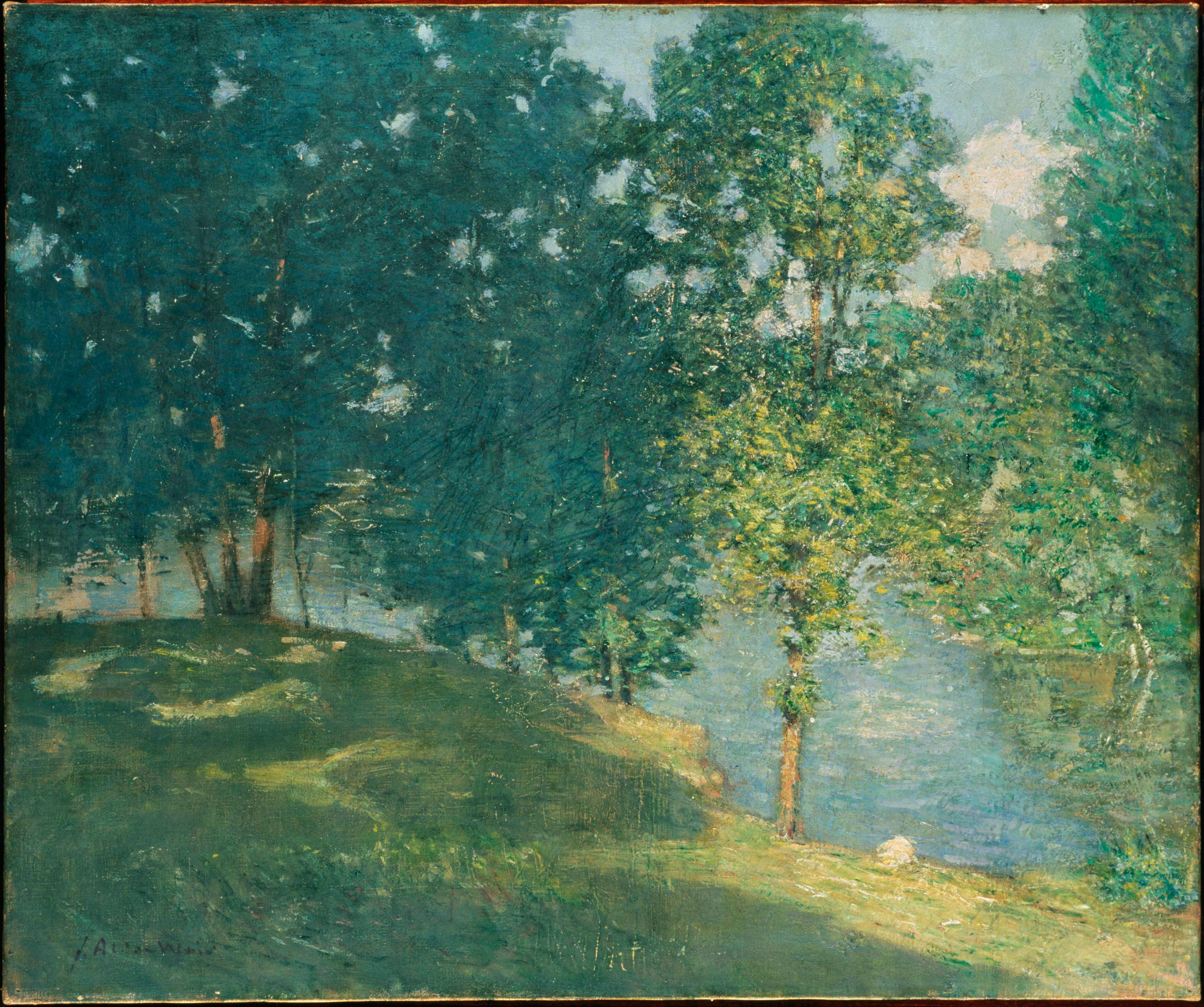
Afternoon by the Pond, c. 1908–1909, The Phillips Collection

During the remainder of his life Weir painted impressionist landscapes and figurative works, many of which centered on his Connecticut farms at Branchville and Windham. His style varied from traditional, vibrant impressionism to a more subdued and shadowy tonalism. He also became skilled at etching. As a rule, his paintings done after 1900 showed a renewed interest of the academicism prevalent in the work of his younger days, with subjects treated less realistically and a greater emphasis placed on drawing and design.

In 1897, Weir became a member of the Ten American Painters, generally known as The Ten, a group of painters who left the Society of American Artists in late 1897 to protest what they saw as the overemphasis on Classical and Romantic Realism over Impressionism by the Society. The Ten exhibited for twenty years until its demise, due to the death of members and the prominence of newer styles.

In 1912 Weir was selected the first president of the Association of American Painters and Sculptors, but resigned a year later following the association's sponsorship of the modernist Armory Show. Weir later became president of the National Academy of Design. He was a member of the U.S. Commission of Fine Arts from 1916 until his death in 1919. He was an early member of the American Academy of Arts and Letters. He was interred at Windham Center Cemetery in Windham, Connecticut.

Among Weir's pupils was the painter Harriet Campbell Foss.

== Legacy ==
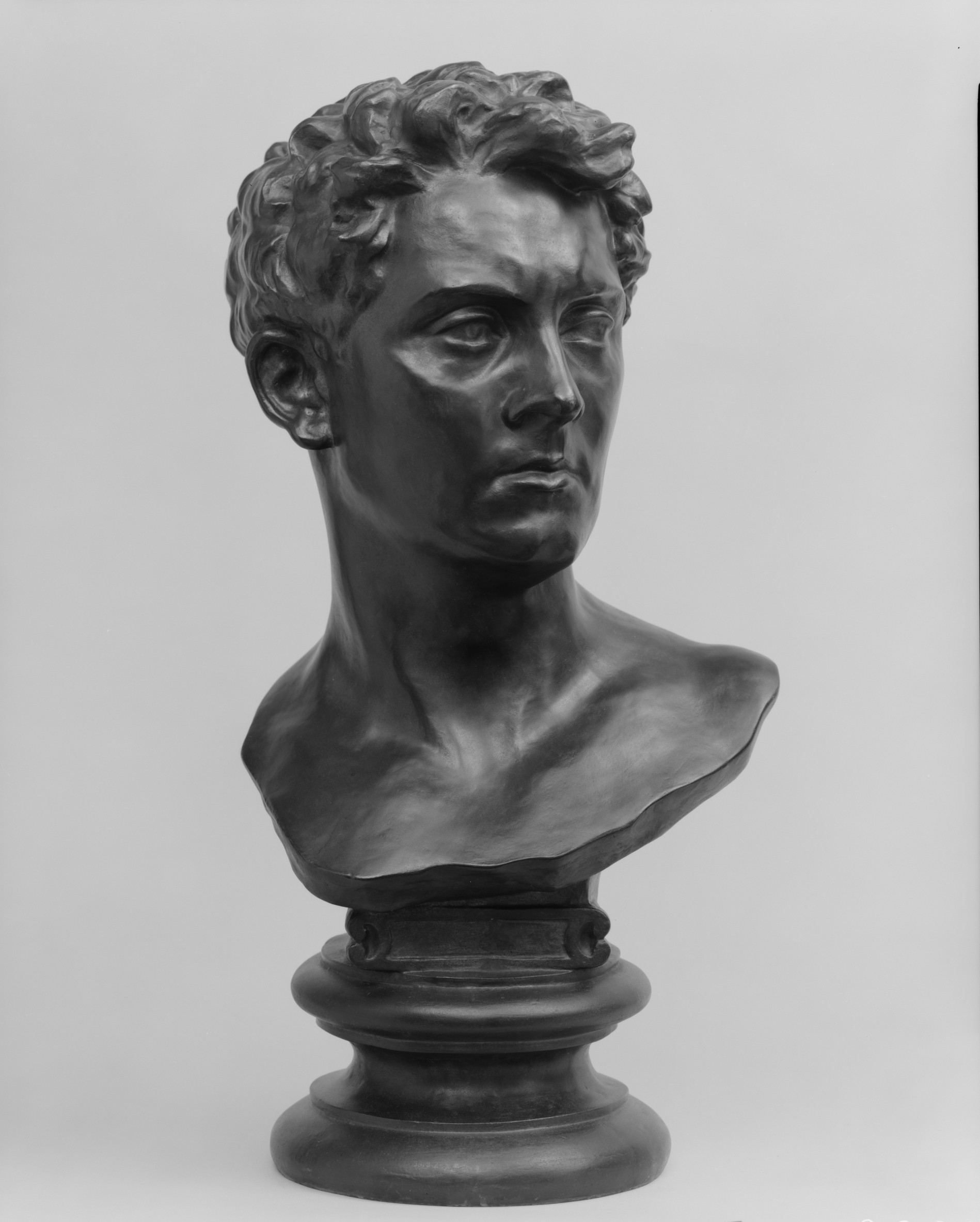
1880 bust of J. Alden Weir, sculpted by Olin Levi Warner

The most critically acclaimed painting by Weir is The Red Bridge from 1895. It is a technical masterpiece, displaying a truss bridge that spanned the Shetucket River down the street from Weir's Windham farm. He used complementary colors to unite the image with equal tonal quality and to depict the realistic reflection of the bridge seen on the water. While there is pictorial unity in the piece, Weir contrasted the bridge and its surrounding setting by placing the red bridge against the greens of woods and the blues of water and sky and by juxtaposing the geometric man-made bridge with the natural sinuous curves of the trunks and branches.

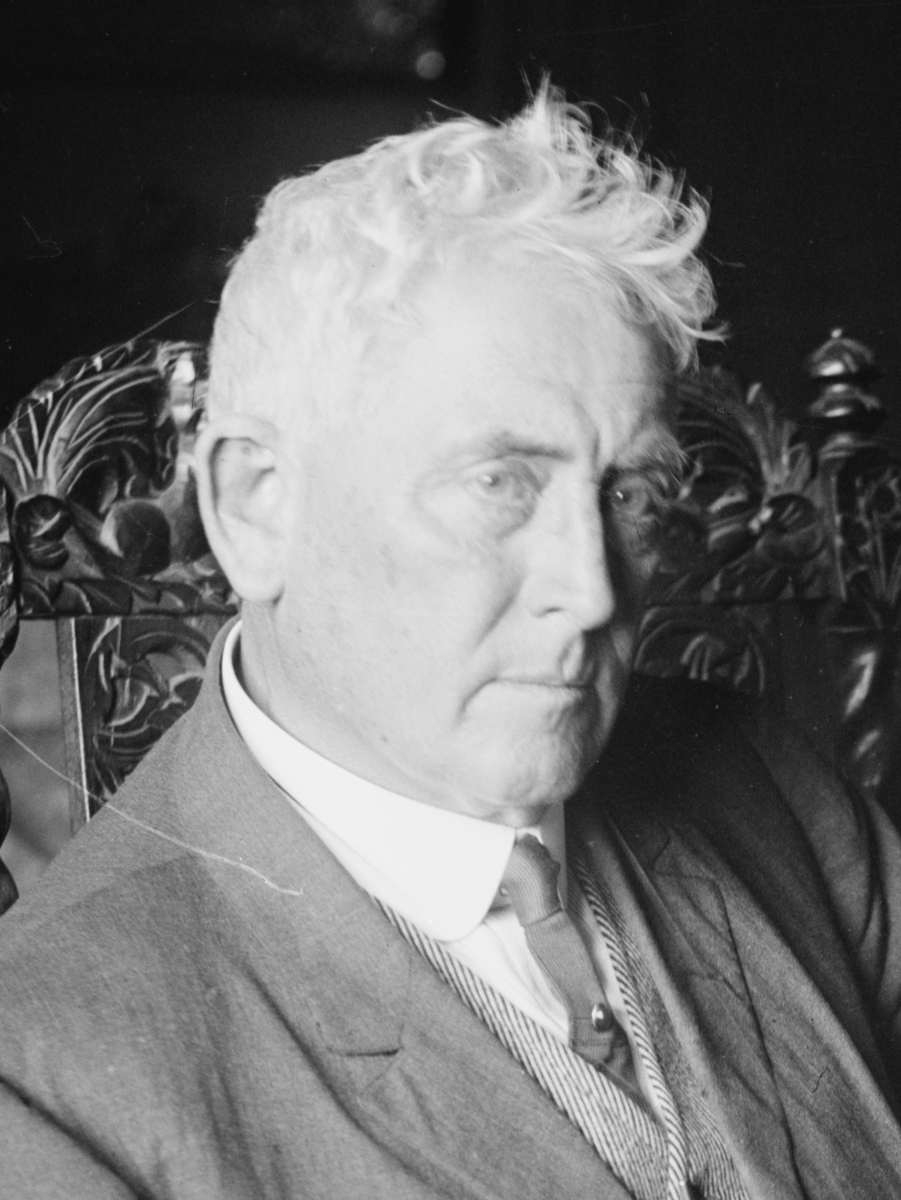
Julian Alden Weir, 1910. In his last decade of life

Today Weir's paintings are in the collections of the Metropolitan Museum of Art, New York; the Phillips Collection, Washington, D.C.; the Smithsonian American Art Museum, Washington, D. C.; Brigham Young University's Museum of Art, Provo, Utah; the Portland Art Museum in Portland, Oregon; and the Wadsworth Atheneum, Hartford, Connecticut. Weir's farm and studio at Branchville are protected as the Weir Farm National Historic Site; the Weir family continues ownership of the Windham farm. His papers are in the Smithsonian Institution's Archives of American Art.

== See also ==
- List of works by J. Alden Weir
- The Ice Cutters, Weir painting
- American Impressionism
- Art Students League
- Society of American Artists
- Ten American Painters
