= The Red Bridge =

1895 painting by J. Alden Weir

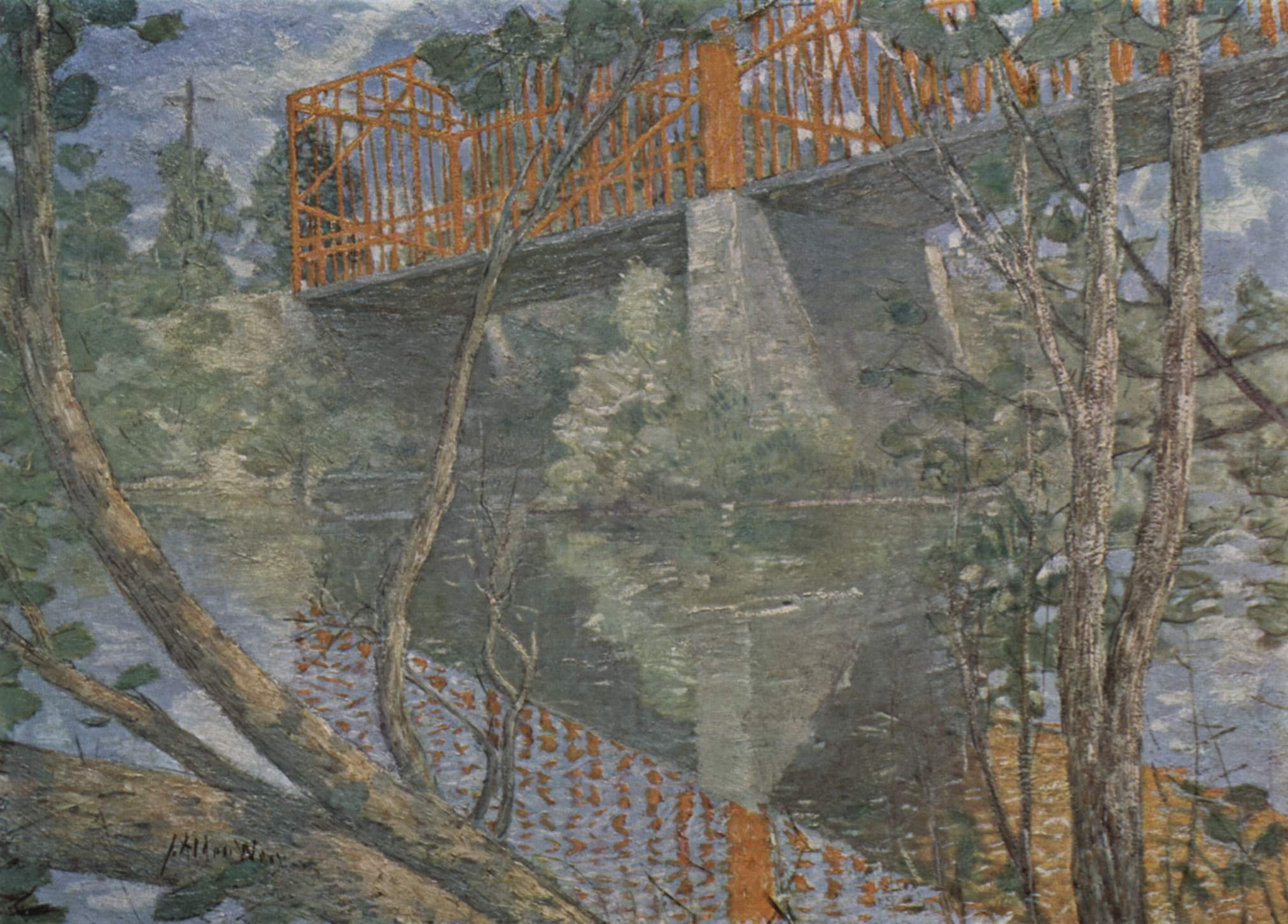
- Artist: Julian Alden Weir
- Year: 1895
- Medium: Oil on canvas
- Dimensions: 61.6 cm × 85.7 cm (24.3 in × 33.7 in)
- Location: Metropolitan Museum of Art, New York
- Accession: 14.141

The Red Bridge is an 1895 painting by American artist Julian Alden Weir. Done in oil on canvas, Red Bridge has been cited as an excellent example of Weir's Japanese-inspired style of impression. The painting is in the collection of the Metropolitan Museum of Art.

== Description ==
The Red Bridge was painted by Weir as an impressionist work; the artist had previously been a detractor of impressionism. The bridge depicted in the painting was a then-new iron truss bridge built over the Shetucket River in Windham, Connecticut. Weir initially viewed the bridge with distaste - it had replaced an older covered bridge he was fond of - but eventually chose to paint a picture of it.

According to the Met, the painting is one of the few American impressionist paintings to refer to industrialization.

== See also ==
- List of works by J. Alden Weir
