= Red Bridge (Chernihiv) =

Bridge in Chernihiv, northern Ukraine

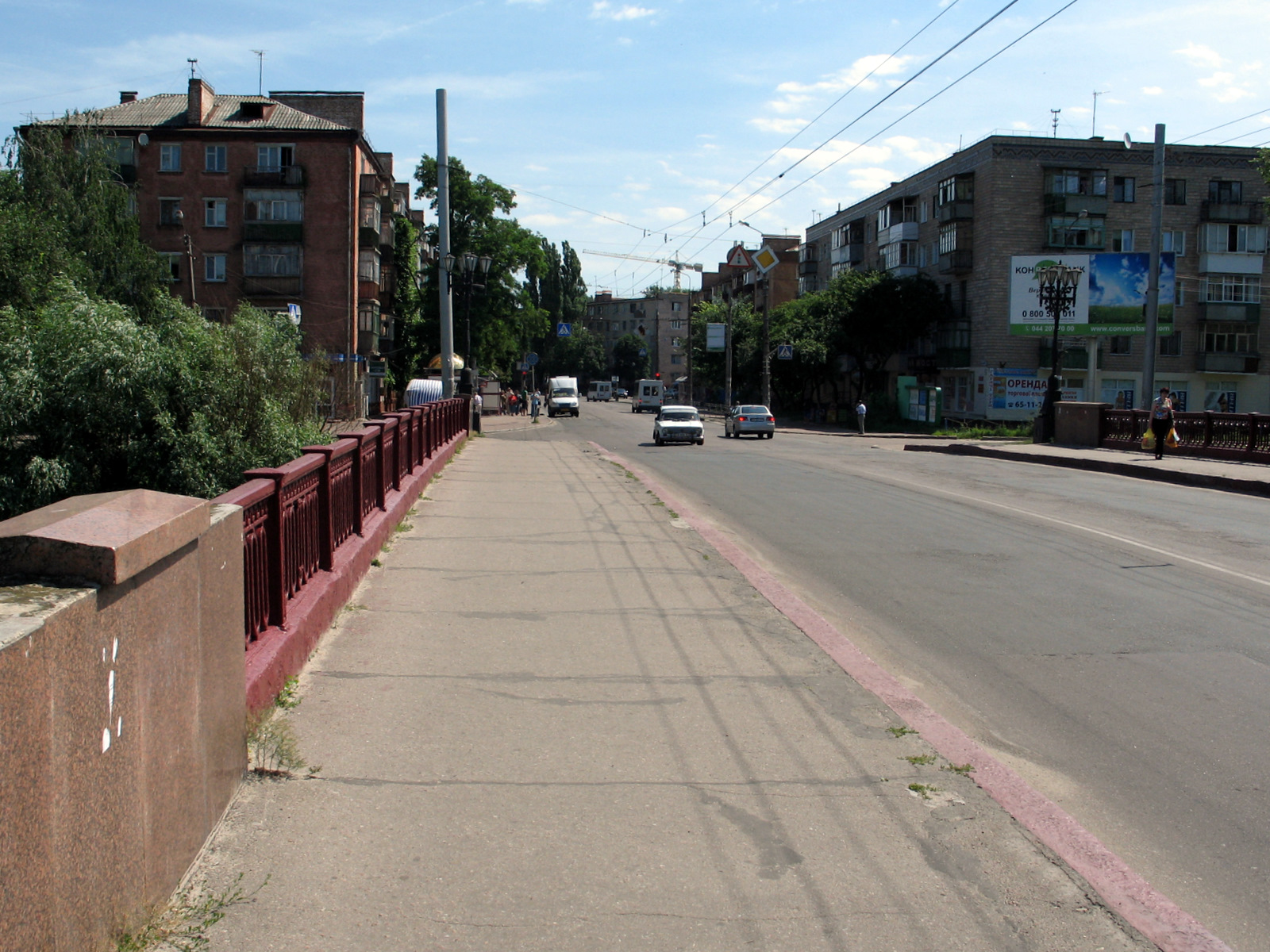
- Red Bridge, Chernihv
- Coordinates: 51°29′45″N 31°18′44″E
- Carries: Motor vehicles and Pedestrians
- Crosses: Stryzhen River
- Locale: Chernihiv, Chernihiv Oblast Ukraine

Characteristics
- Material: Brick and Stone

History
- Designer: V. Ustinov
- Construction start: 1660
- Replaces: 1964

Location
- Interactive map of Red Bridge

The Red Bridge (Ukrainian: Червоний Міст, romanized: Chervonyi Mist) is a brick-and-stone bridge in the city of Chernihiv in Ukraine. The bridge is carries Shevchenko Street over the Strizhen River and it is located just near the Museum of Military History, Park Miskyi Sad and Chernihiv Stadium.

== History ==
On the beginning in the 17th century on the Strizhen River, there were Bishop's ponds, aimed at servicing the mills located on the corresponding dams. One of them, the Dung Dam, had a bridge that connected the Stolbovoy Glukhovsky Way with Chernigov. This transition probably could have appeared as early as the 1660s; as of 1706, it has already been marked on the "Abris of Chernihiv" - the oldest discovered plan of the city. In the spring of 1773, a great flood washed away the dam. In 1783, a new wooden bridge on stilts was erected on the Strizhen River; it is likely that A. Shafonsky remembers it in 1786 under the name Red - the first recorded mention of the name of the bridge. The length of the bridge was 50 fathoms (about 100 m). The building was repaired and rebuilt several times. So, it is known that already in 1786, the governor of Chernigov A. Miloradovich demanded a major overhaul of the covering of the roadway of the bridge with the so-called thick forest, instead of the fascinator and vines adopted at that time. In 1885, a flood swept away the Red Bridge.

In a short time, it was restored, but the new height of the bridge turned out to be inconvenient for travel, therefore, in 1900, work was carried out to lower it by about a meter, for which 500 rubles were spent from the city treasury. In the spring of 1911, another flood destroyed the bridge again; temporarily, the main traffic between the territories of the city and Zastrizhenya was taken over by the newly built Seminarsky Bridge. Eventually, during 1914-1916, a new bridge was built on reinforced concrete piles, which included three reinforced concrete girders with cast iron parapets along the sidewalks.

Red Bridge,city Chernihiv 1916 year

During the Second World War, the bridge was damaged, but despite this, Soviet troops entered the city along it.

In 1964, in connection with the opening of trolleybus traffic, according to the project of V. Ustinov, the bridge was reconstructed and expanded. On both sides, concrete piles were added, on which the sidewalks were completed; the old bridge became the carriageway of the reconstructed one.

The modern bridge is painted red, has polished red granite trim and antique styled lanterns.

== Gallery ==
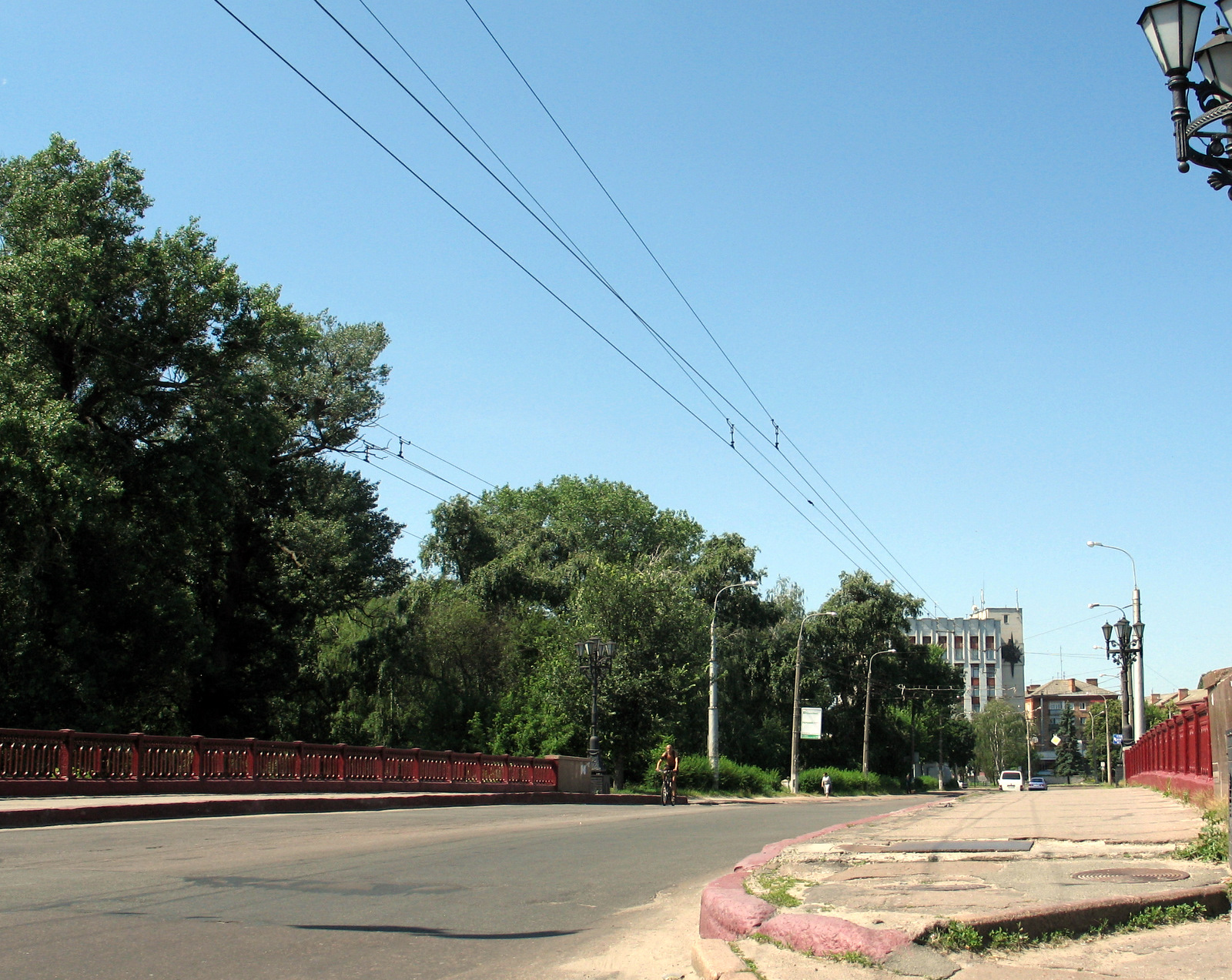
View of the Red Bridge in Chernihiv

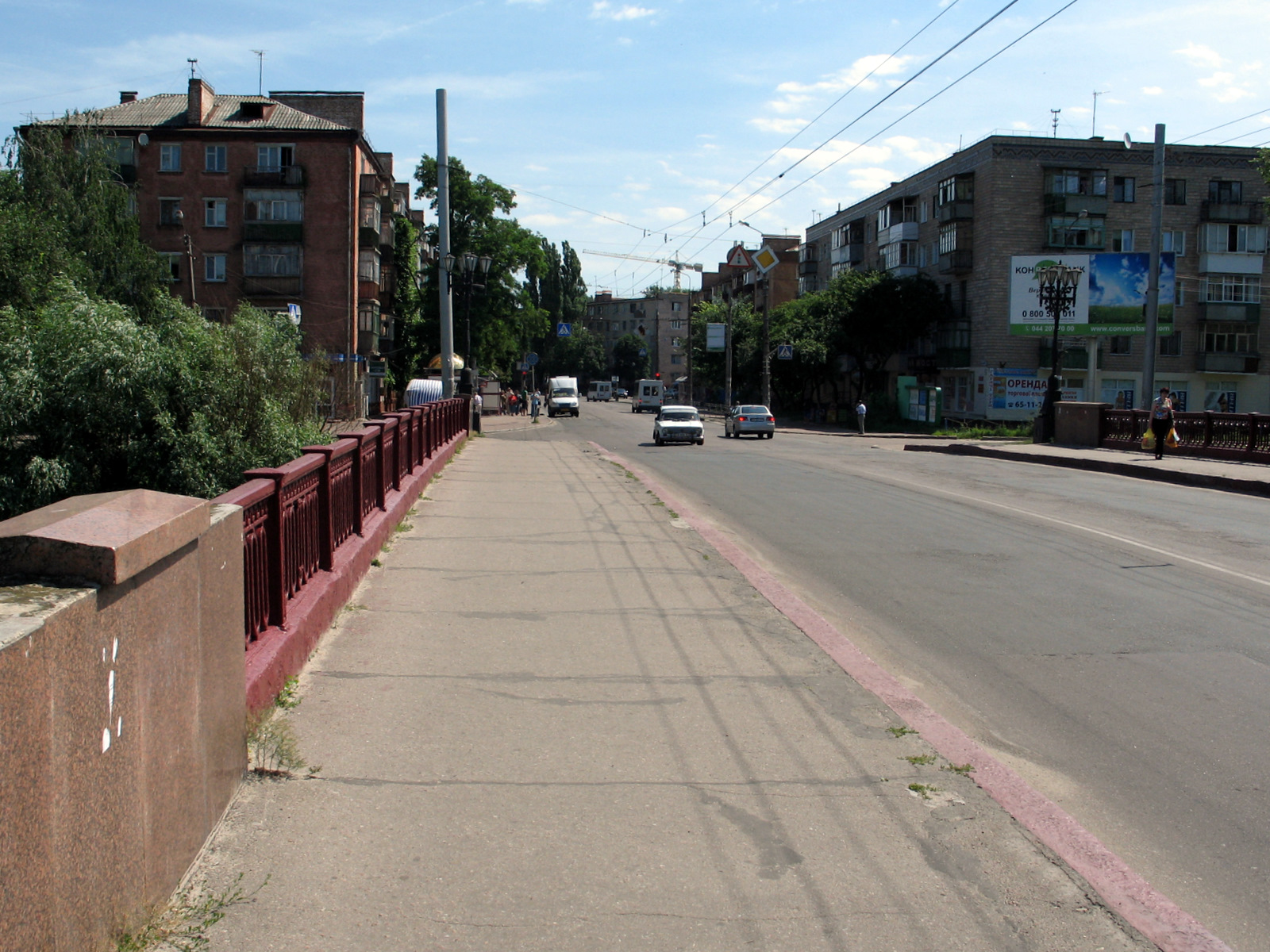
View of the Red Bridge in Chernihiv

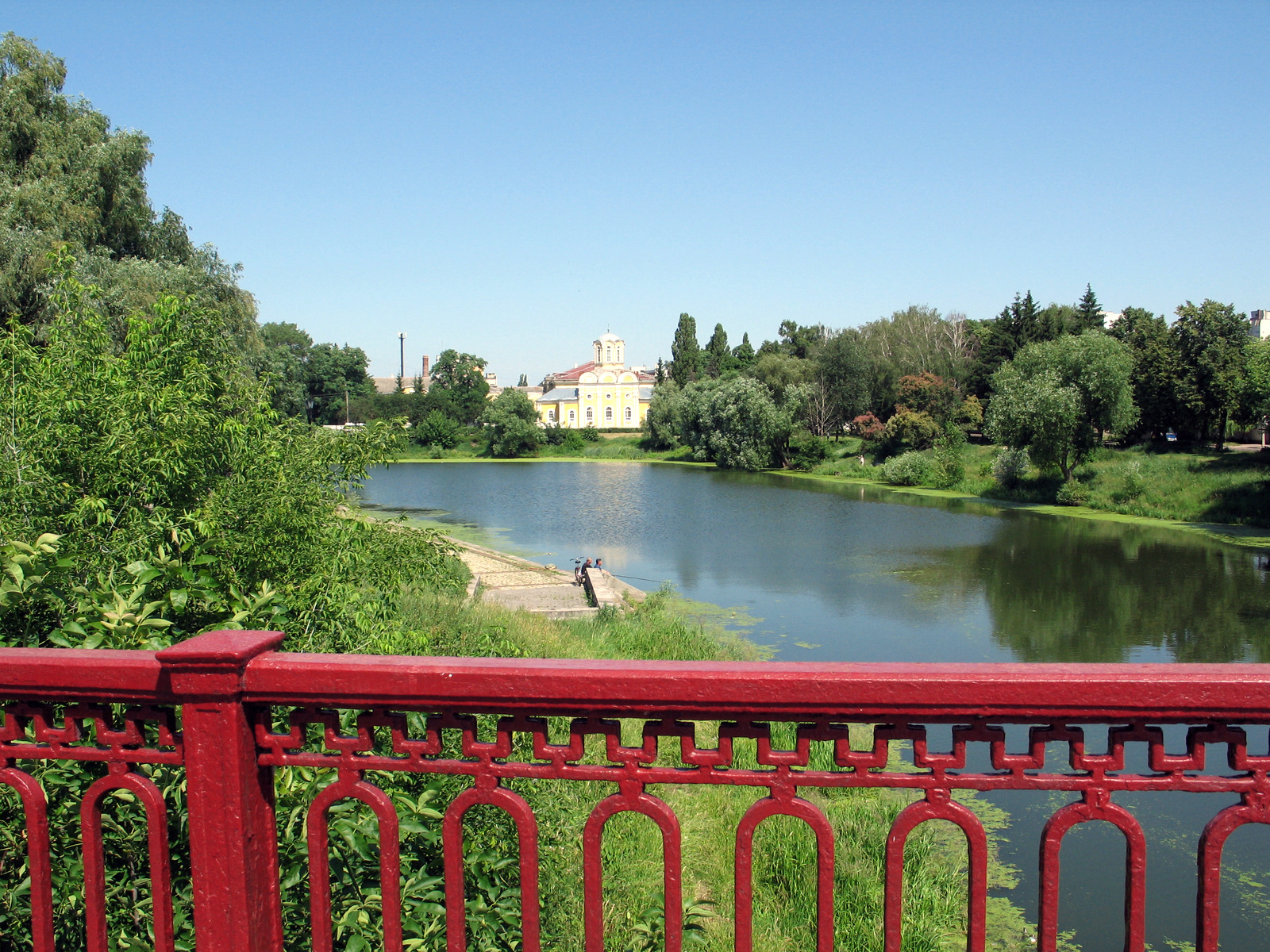
