= List of works by J. Alden Weir =

This is a list of art by J. Alden Weir, the American impressionist painter:

== A ==
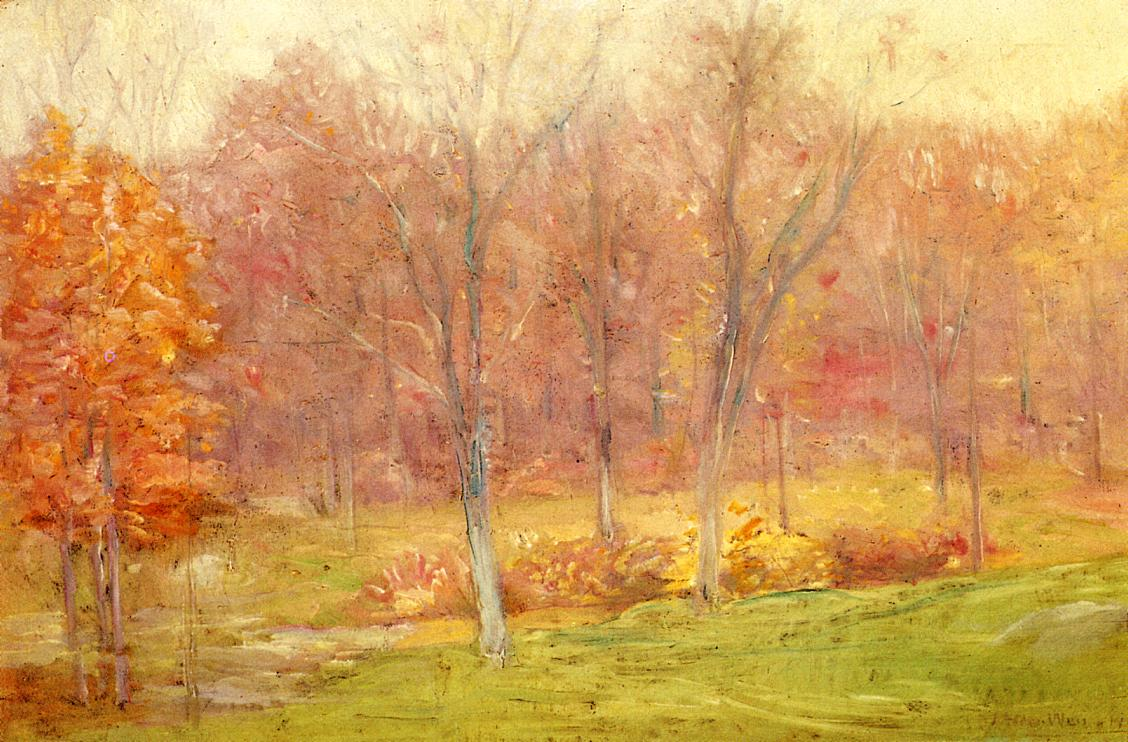
Autumn Rain

- After the Ride (a.k.a. Visiting Neighbors) Date unknown
- Afternoon by the Pond ca 1908-1909 Painting - oil on canvas
- An Alsatian Girl Date unknown
- At the Piano 1876-1877 Painting - oil on canvas
- Autumn Days 1900-1910 Painting - oil on canvas
- Autumn Rain 1890

== B ==
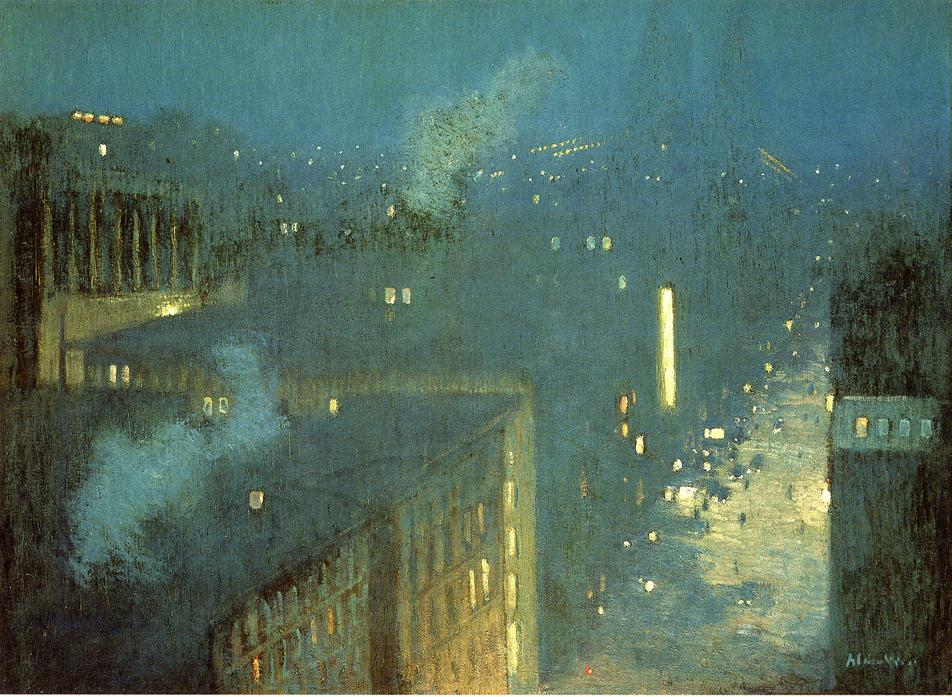
The Bridge: Nocturne

- Back Road 1900-1910 Painting - oil on canvas
- The Birches 1903 Painting - oil on canvas
- The Black Hat 1898 Painting - oil on canvas
- The Blue Gown 1907 Painting - oil on canvas
- Branchville, Connecticut Date unknown
- The Bridge: Nocturne (a.k.a. Nocturne: Queensboro Bridge) 1910 Painting - oil on canvas
- The Building of the Dam 1908 Painting - oil on canvas

== C ==
- Connecticut Scene at Branchville Date unknown
- Cora Date unknown

== F ==
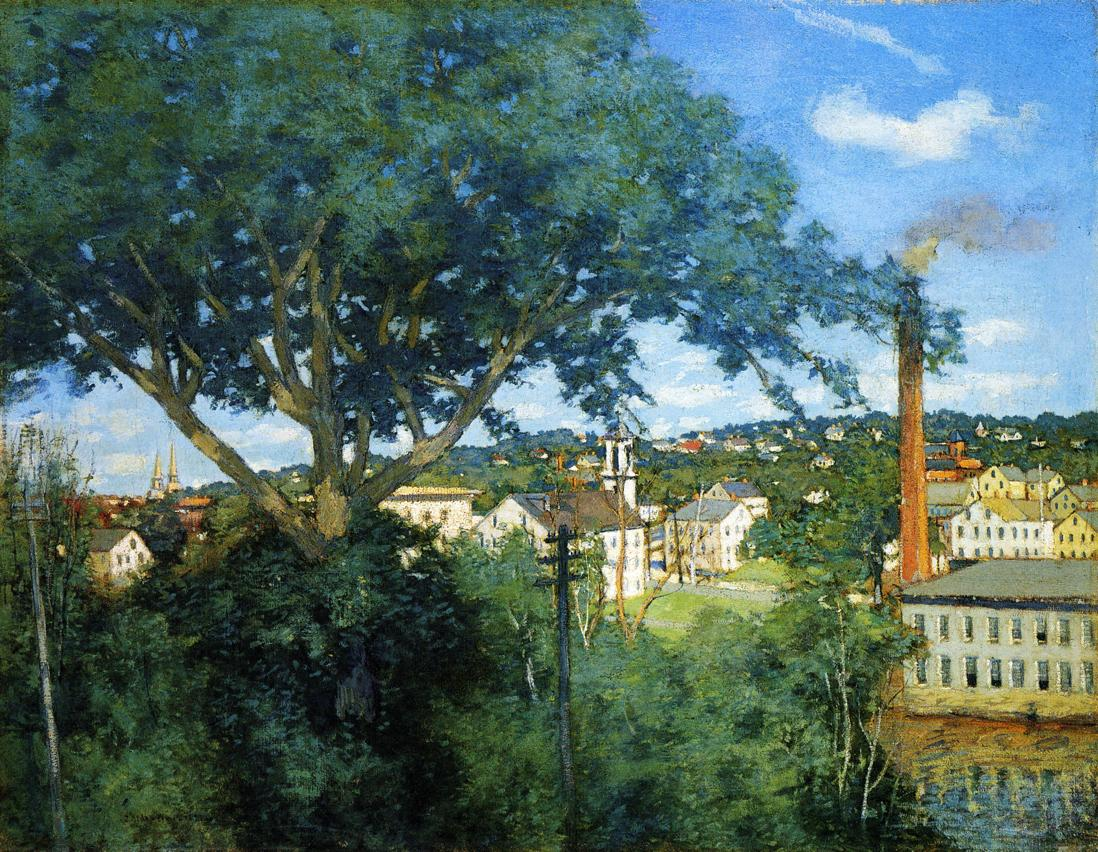
The Factory Village

- Face Reflected in a Mirror 1896 Painting - oil on canvas
- The Factory Village 1897 Painting - oil on canvas
- The Farmer's Lawn 1880-1889 Unknown
- Fireside Dreams 1887 Painting - watercolor
- Flowers in a Delft Jug Date unknown
- A Follower of Groliier Date unknown

== G ==
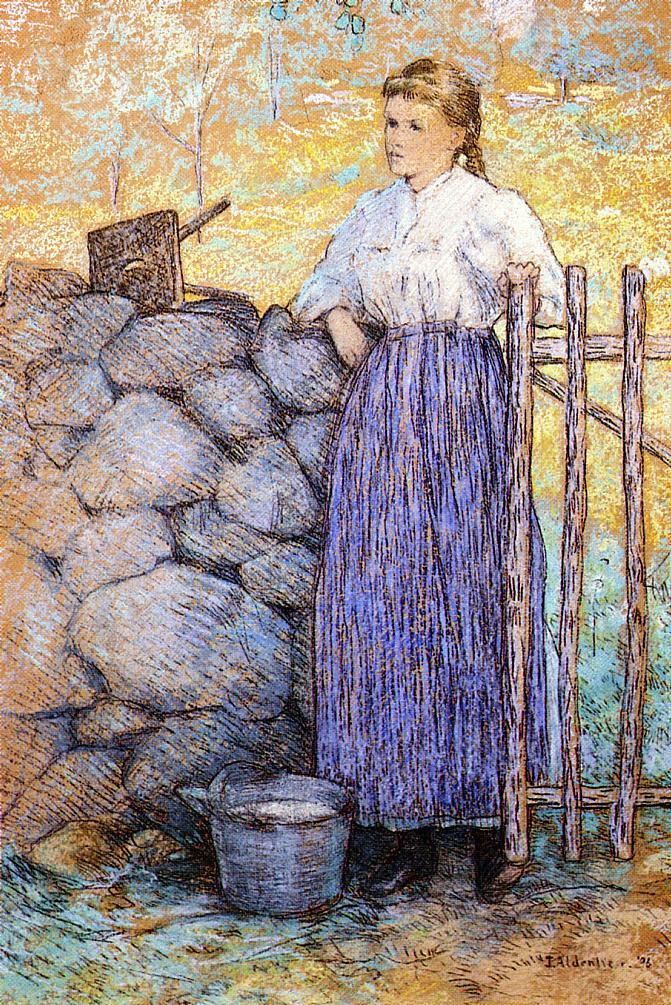
Girl Standing by a Gate

- Girl Knitting Date unknown
- Girl Standing by a Gate Date unknown
- Grapes, Knife and Glass, after 1880
- Green Hills and Farmland Date unknown
- The Grey Trellis 1891 Painting - oil on canvas
- The Yellow Turban ca.

== H ==
- Houses in Pasture Date unknown

== I ==
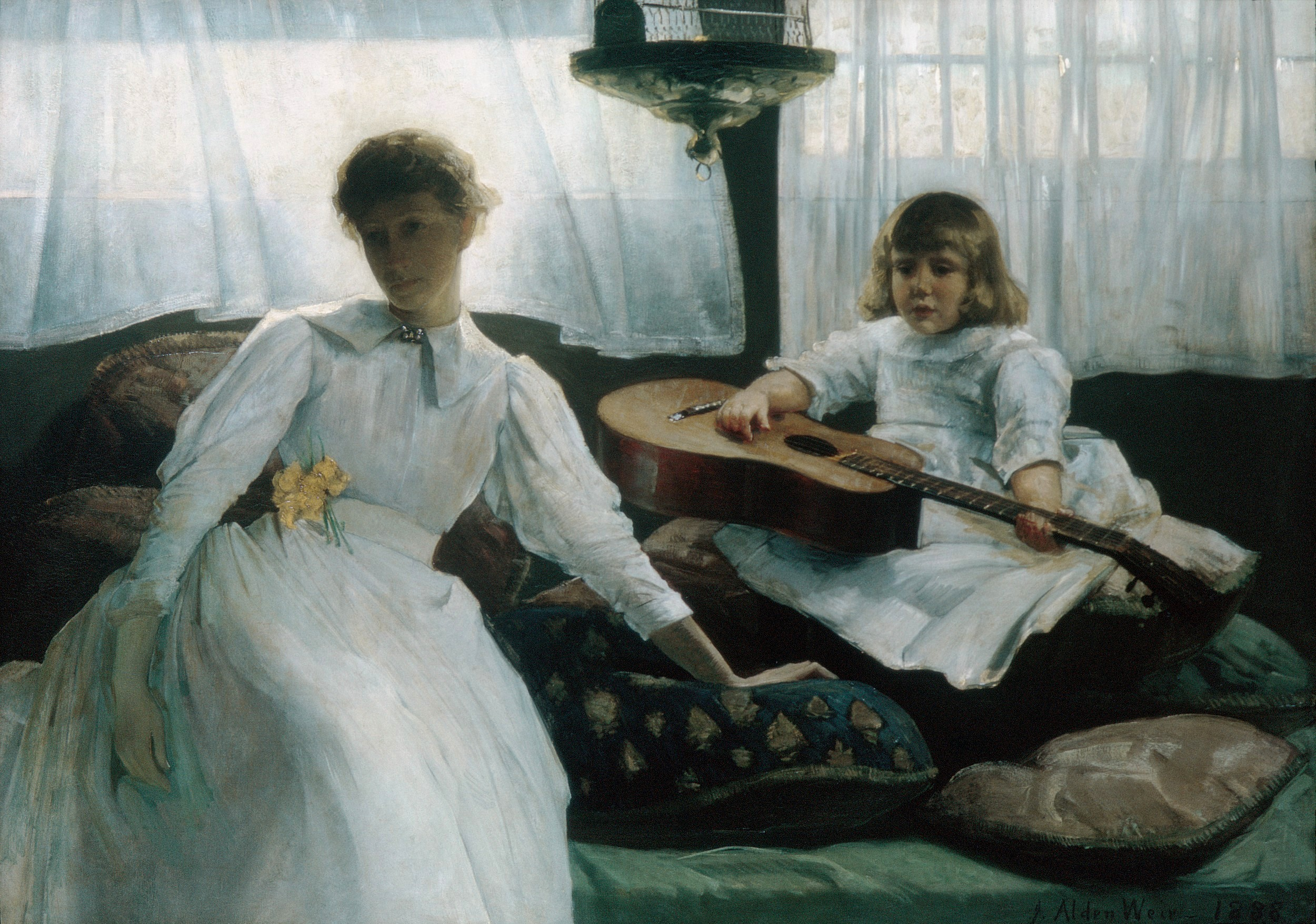
Idle Hours

- The Ice Cutters 1895 Painting - oil on canvas
- Ideal Head Date unknown Painting - oil on board
- Idle Hours 1888 Painting - oil on canvas
- The Inlet Date unknown Drawing
- In the Livingroom 1890 Painting - oil on canvas

== K ==
- Knitting for Soldiers 1918 Painting - oil on canvas

== L ==
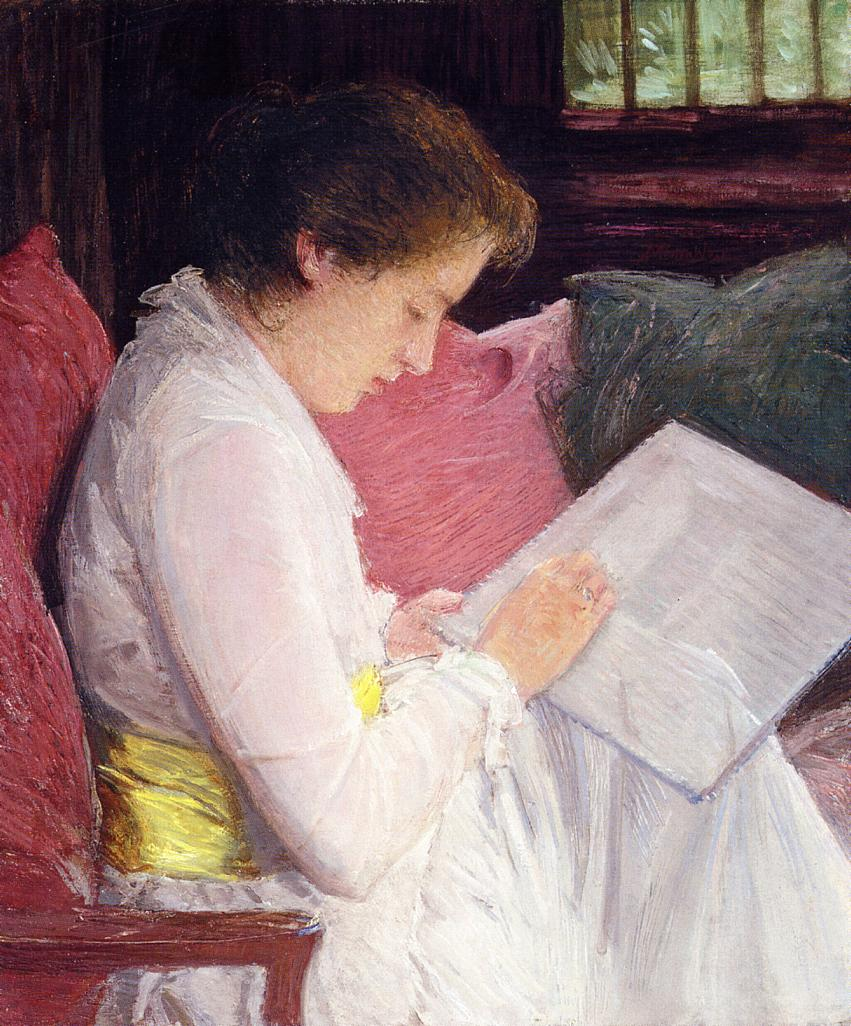
The Lace Maker

- The Lace Maker Date unknown Painting - oil on canvas
- Landscape with Seated Figure Date unknown Painting - oil on canvas
- Landscape with Steeple, Wyndham 1892 Painting - oil on canvas
- Landscape with Stone Wall, Windham 1892 Painting - oil on canvas
- The Laundry, Branchville 1894 Painting - oil on canvas
- The Letter 1910-1919 Painting - oil on canvas
- Little Lizie Lynch 1910 Painting - oil on canvas
- Loading Ice Date unknown Painting - oil on canvas

== M ==
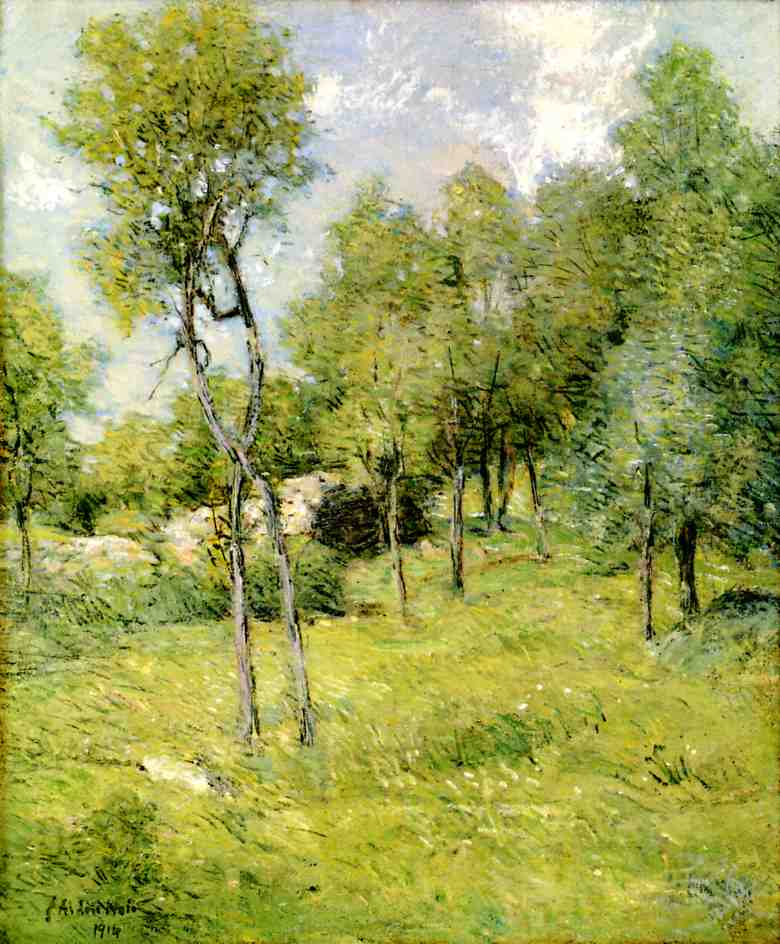
Midsummer Landscape

- Midday 1891 Painting - oil on canvas
- Midsummer Landscape 1914 Painting - oil on canvas
- Miss Edith Potter undated Painting - oil on canvas
- Mother and Child Date unknown Painting - oil on canvas
- Mother and Child 1891 Painting - oil on canvas

== N ==
- Nassau, Bahamas 1913 Painting - oil on canvas
- New England Barnyard 1904 Painting - oil on canvas

== O ==
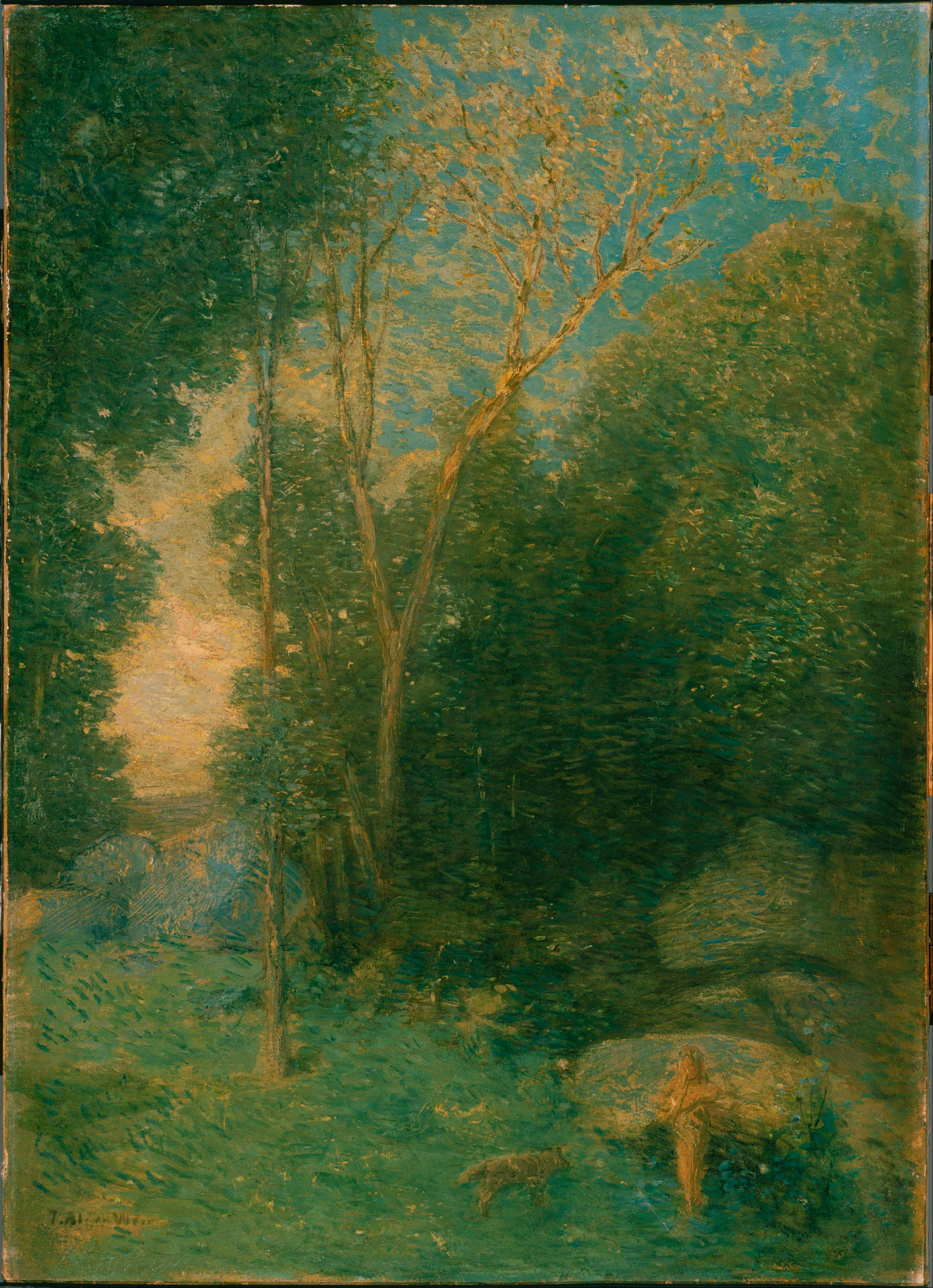
Pan and the Wolf

- On the Shore 1909 Painting - oil on canvas
- Overhanging Trees 1909 Painting - oil on canvas

== P ==
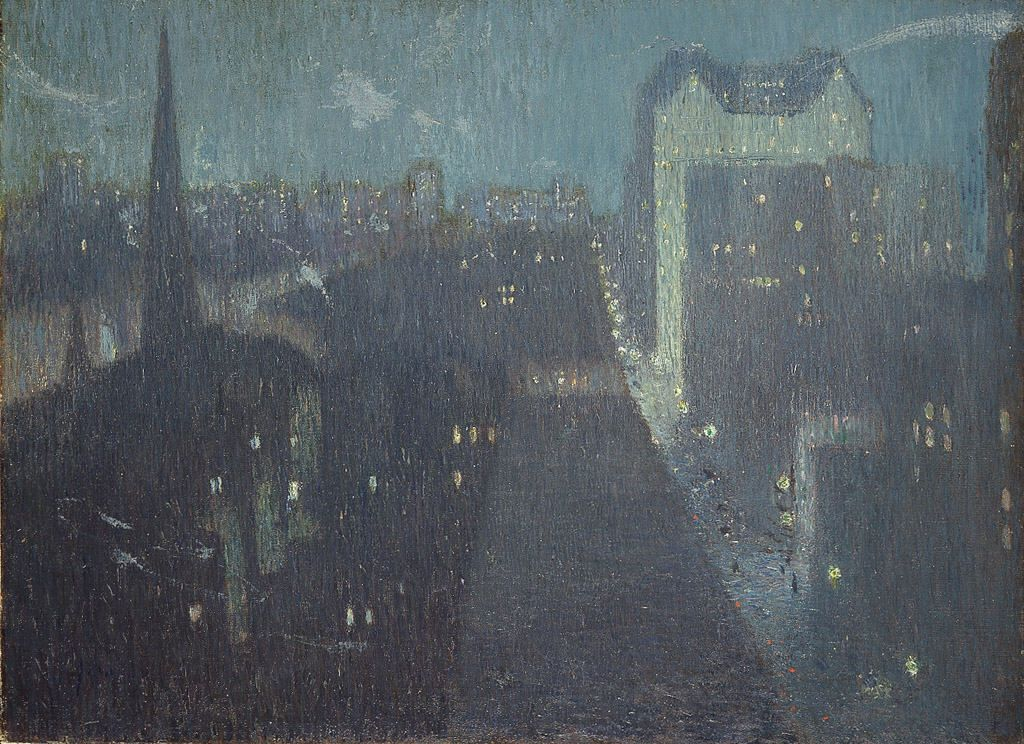
The Plaza: Nocturne

- Pan and the Wolf ca 1907
- Portrait of a Young Woman with Ivy in her Hair ca 1890
- Portrait of Mrs. Robert Walter Weir ca 1885
- Portrait of Robert Walter Weir ca 1885
- Ploughing for Buckwheat 1909 or earlier
- The Path in the Woods ca 1903
- The Plaza: Nocturne 1911
- "Portobello Pier from near Joppa Saltpans" 1893

== R ==
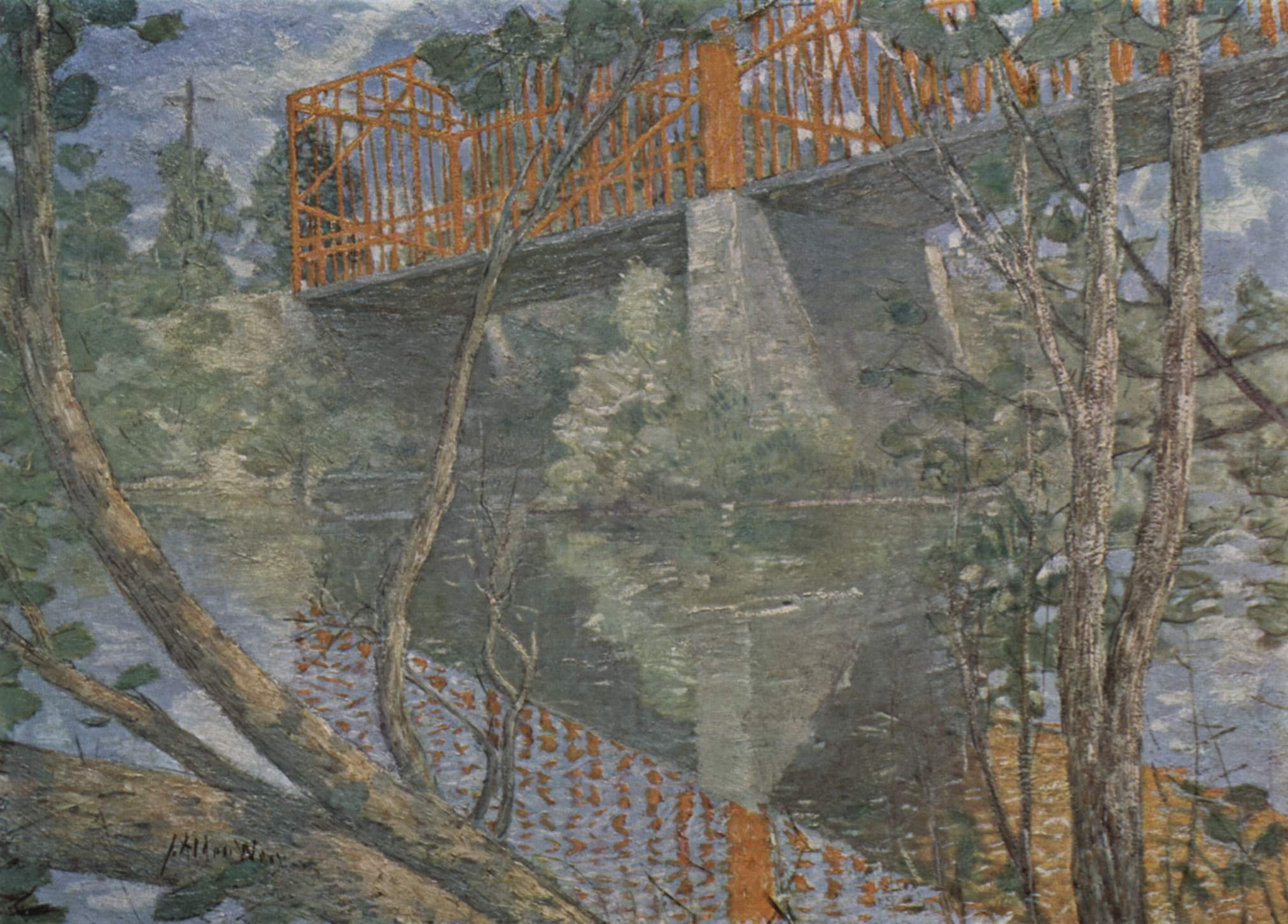
The Red Bridge

- Ravine near Branchville 1905-1915 Painting - oil on canvas
- The Red Bridge 1895 Painting - oil on canvas
- The Return of the Fishing Party, oil on canvas, 1906
- The Road to No-Where 1880-1889 Painting - oil on canvas
- Roses 1883 -1884 Painting - oil on canvas
- Roses in a Silver Bowl on a Mahogany Table 1888-1890 Painting - oil on canvas

== S ==
- Silver Chalice with Roses 1882 Painting - oil on canvas
- Silver Chalice, Japanese Bronze and Red Tapir 1884-1889 Painting - oil on canvas
- Still Life 1902-1905 Painting - oil on canvas
- Studio Tea Unknown date
- Summer (a.k.a. Friends) 1898 Painting - oil on canvas
- Summer Afternoon, Shinnecock Landscape 1902 Painting - oil on canvas

== U ==
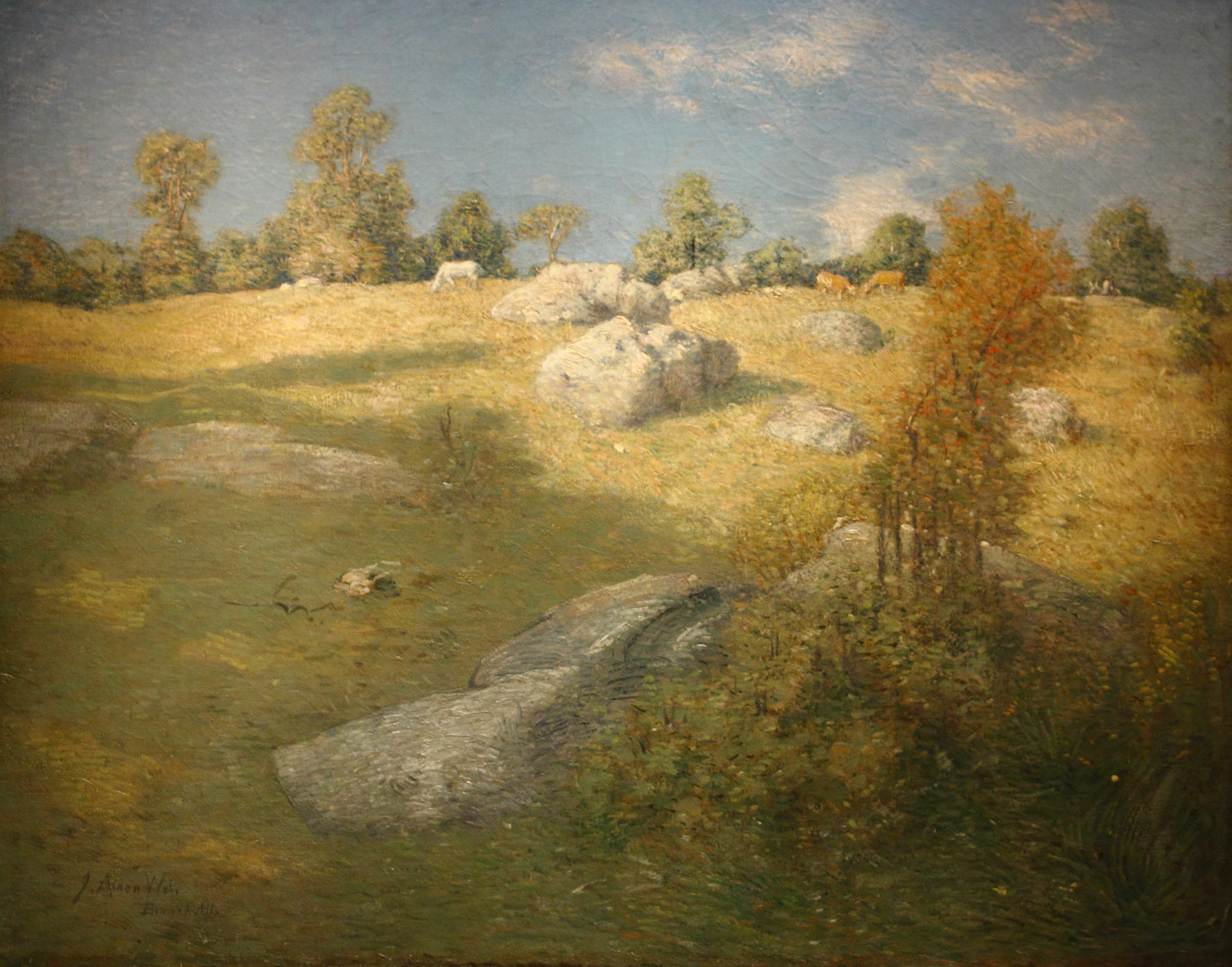
Upland Pasture

- Upland Pasture 1905 Painting - oil on canvas

== V ==
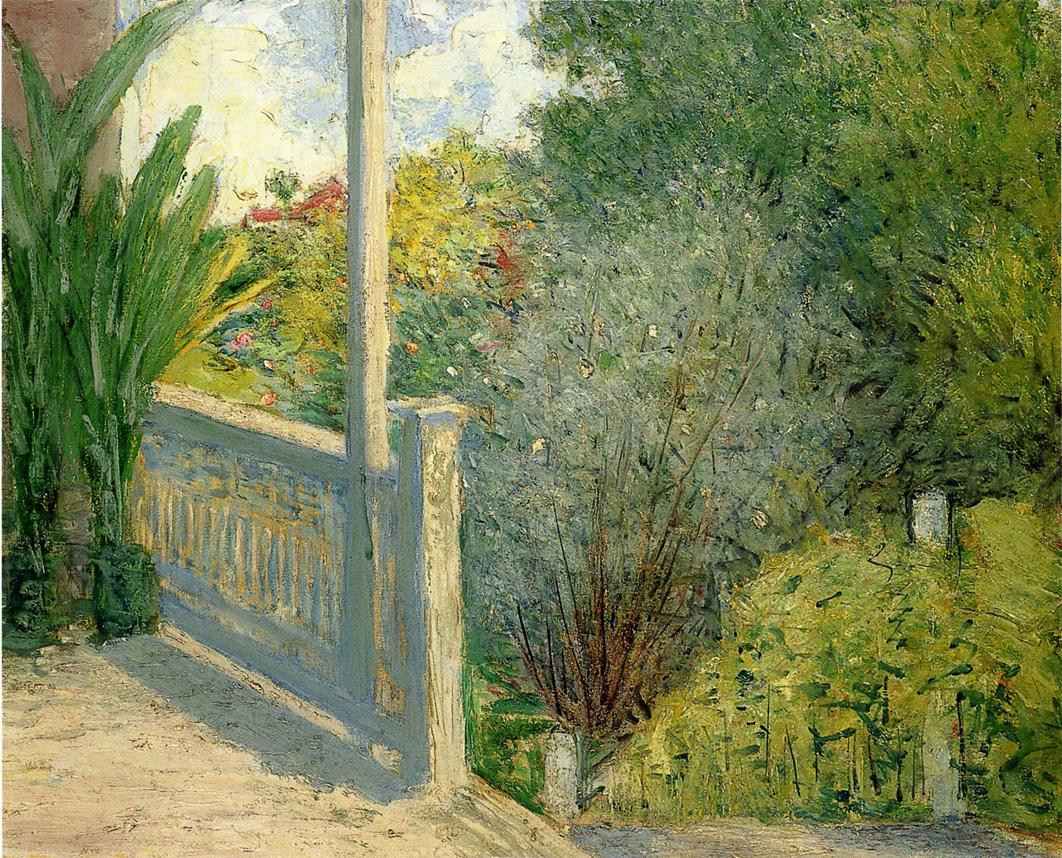
The Veranda

- Vase and Roses 1886-1889 Painting - oil on canvas
- The Veranda 1900 Painting - oil on canvas

== W ==
- The Wharves, Nassau 1913 Painting - oil on canvas
- Winter Landscape with Stream 1888 Painting - oil on canvas
- Woodland Rocks 1910-1919 Painting - oil on canvas
- Woods in the Snow 1895 Painting- oil on canvas

== Y ==
- The Yellow Turban ca 1900

== Gallery ==
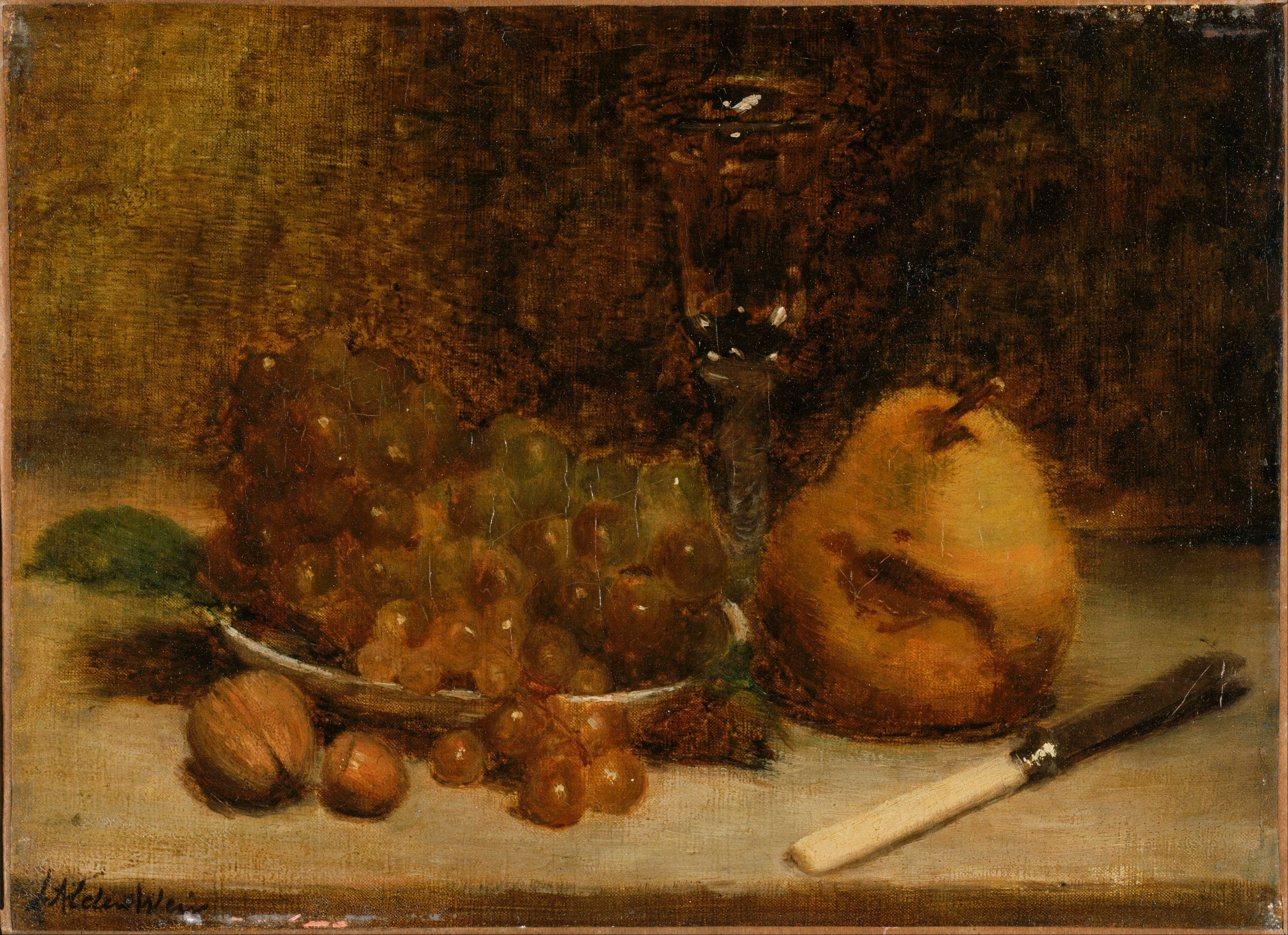
Grapes, Knife and Glass after 1880

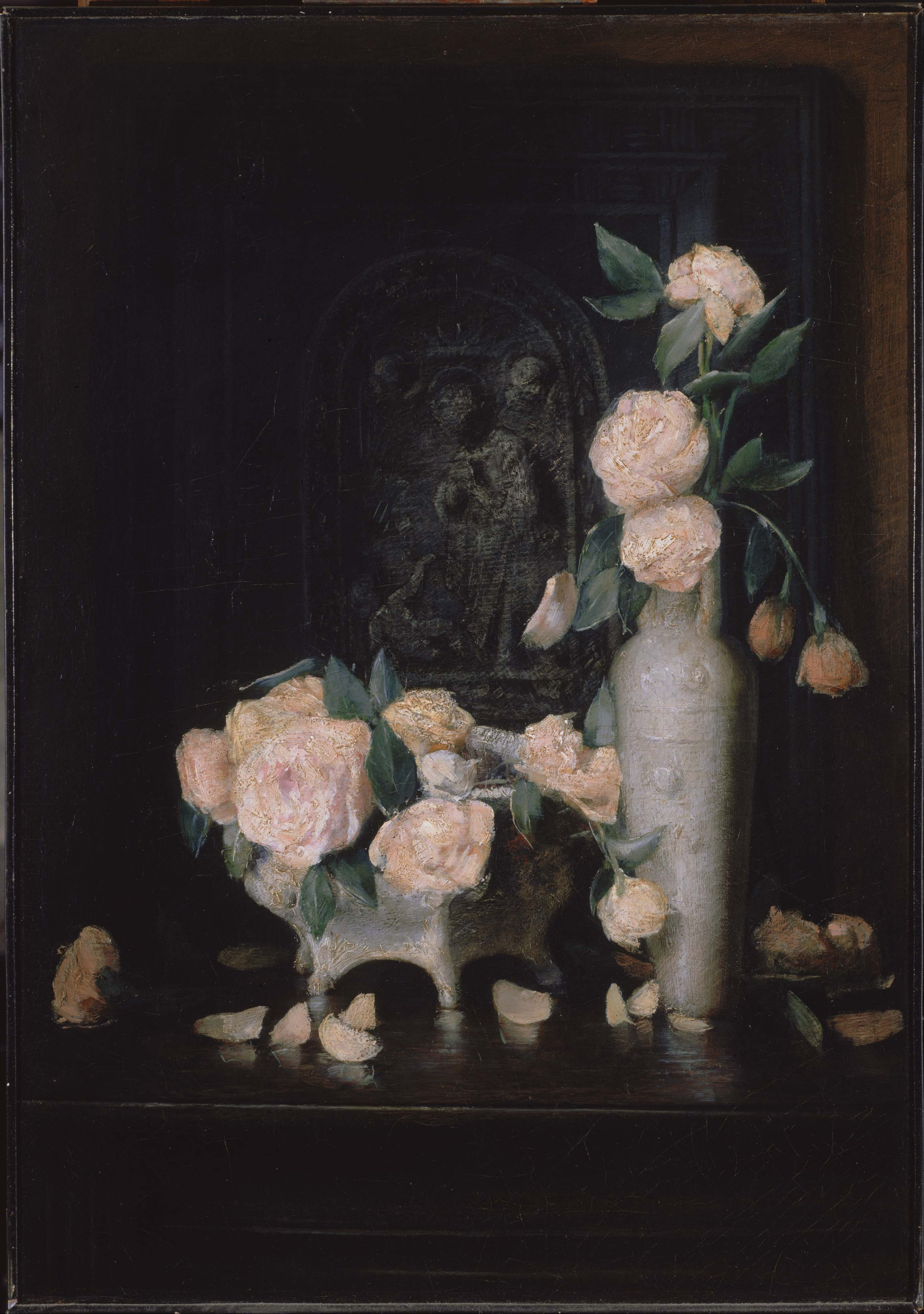
Roses 1883-1884

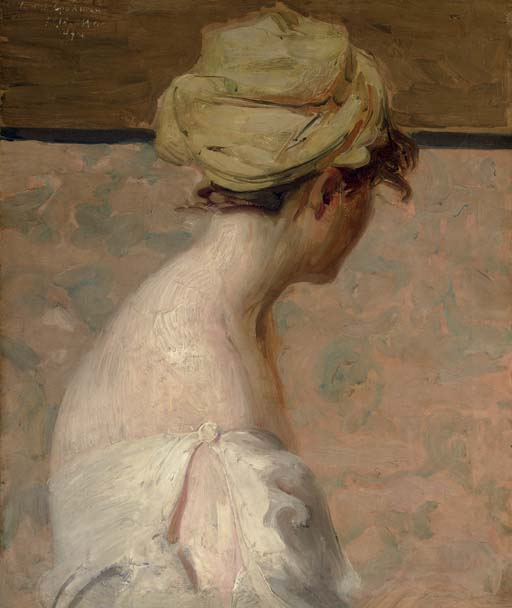
The Yellow Turban ca 1900

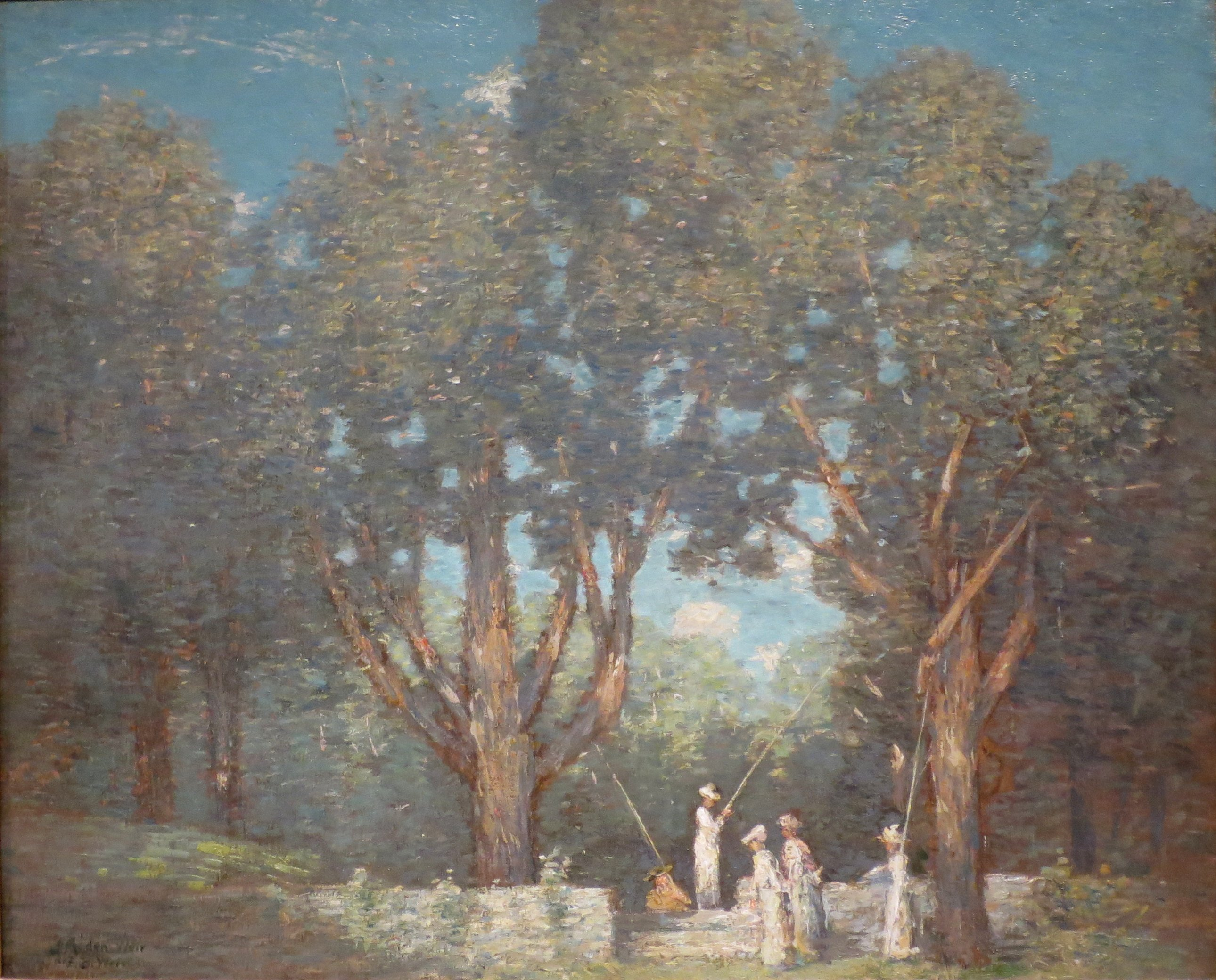
The Return of the Fishing Party 1906

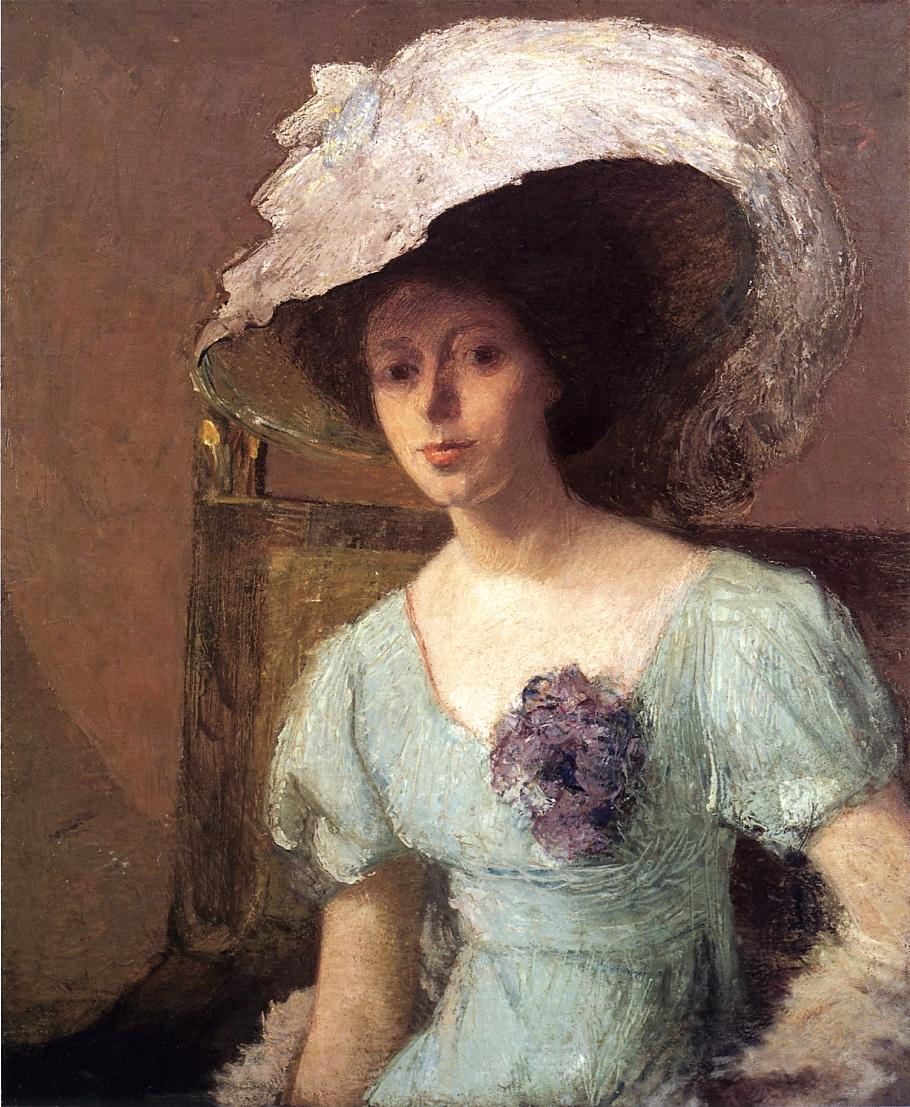
The Blue Gown 1907

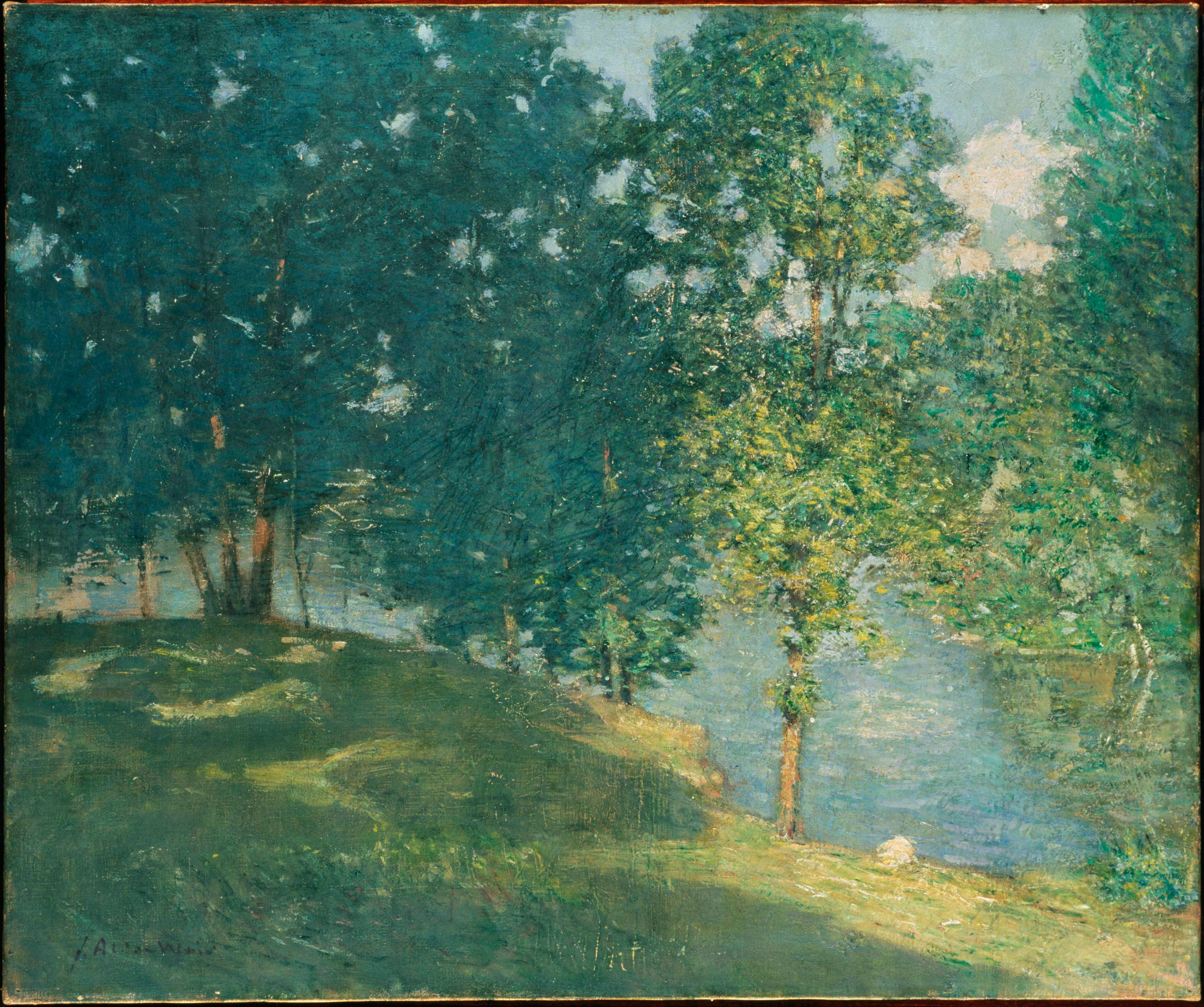
Afternoon by the Pond ca 1908-1909

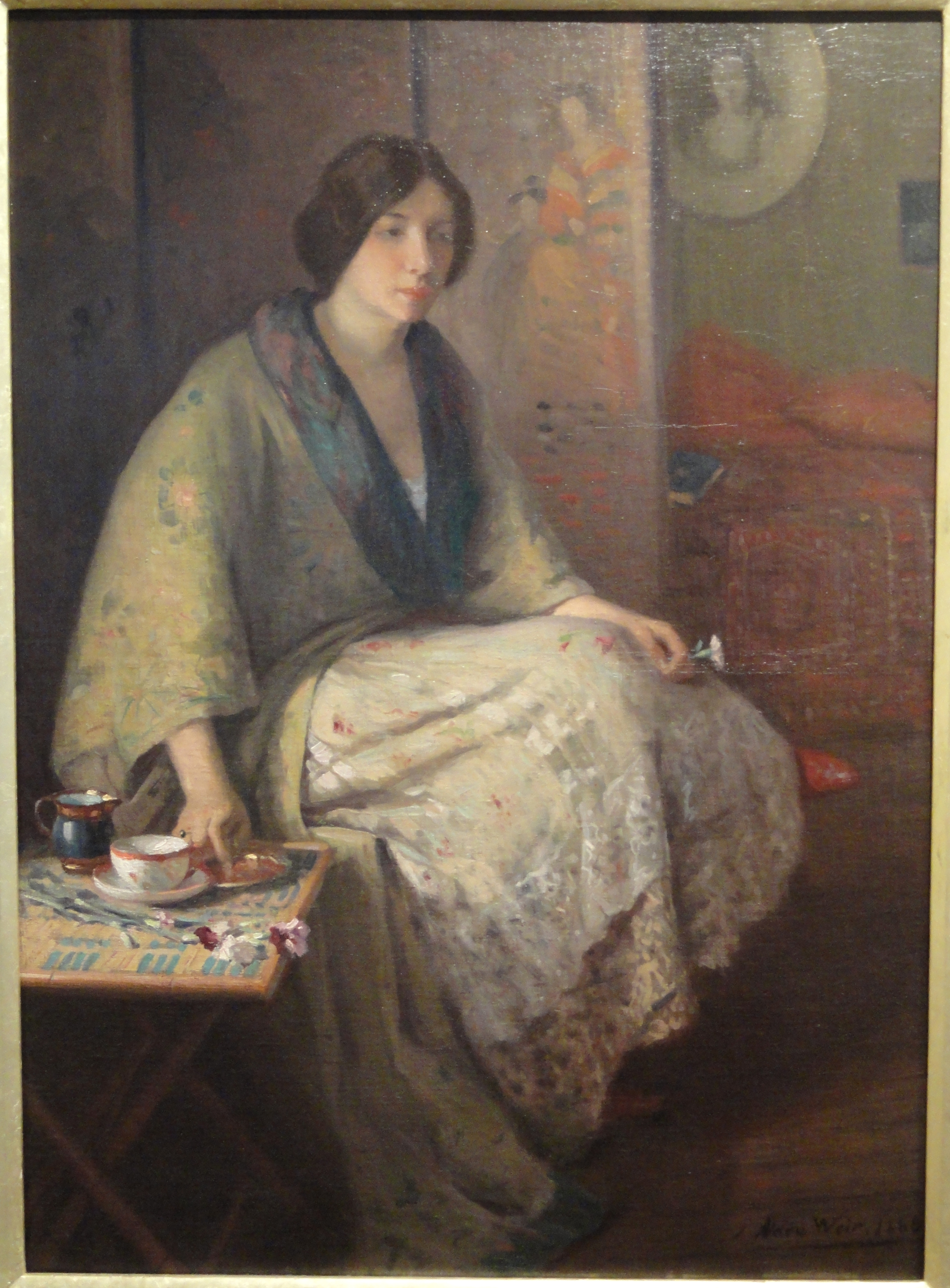
Studio Tea

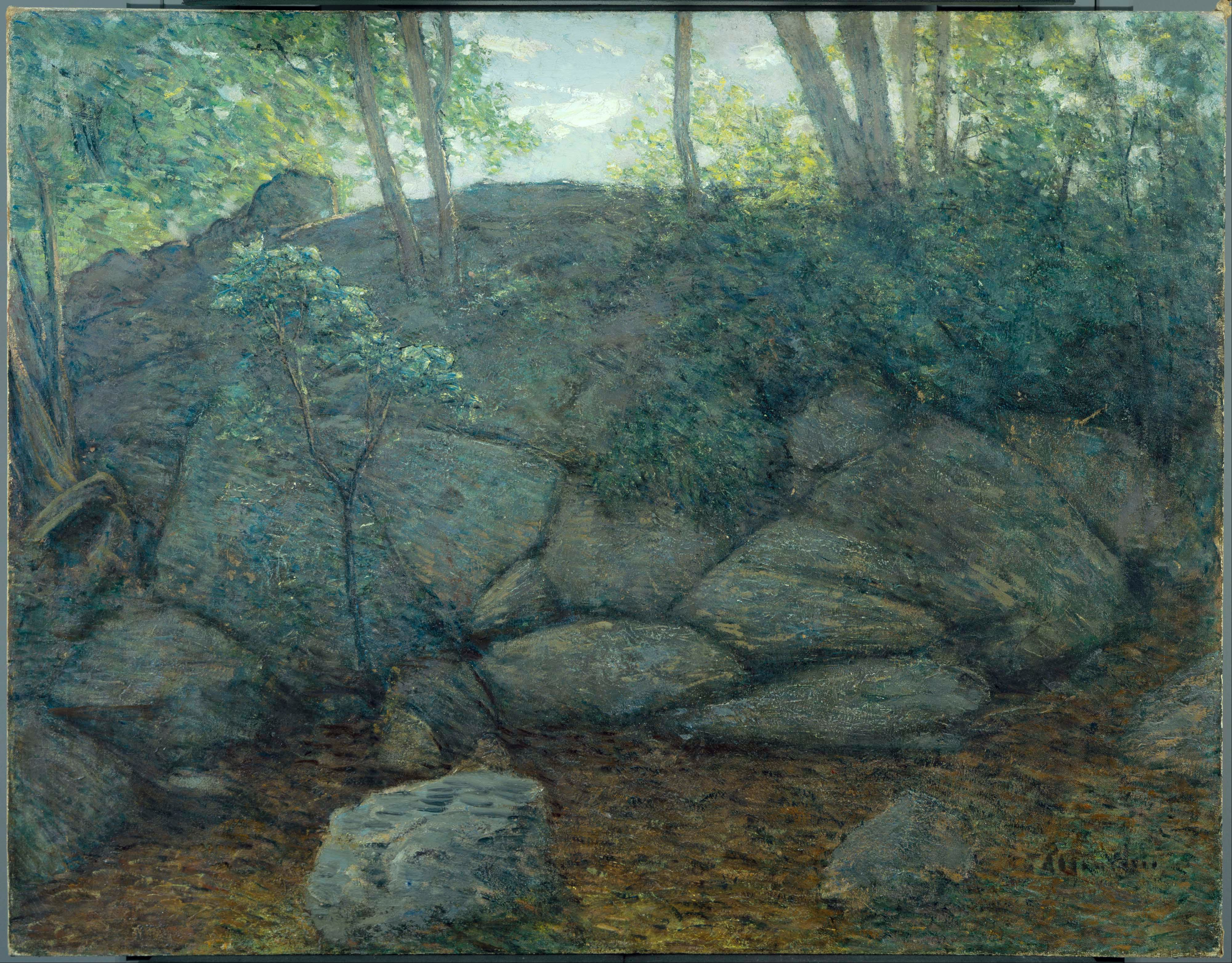
Woodland Rocks 1910-1919

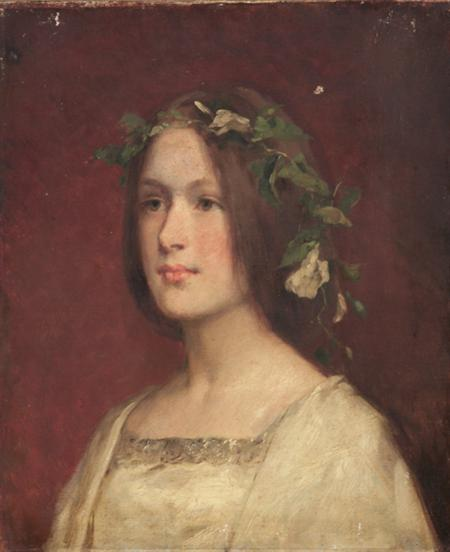
Portrait of a Young Woman with Ivy in her Hair

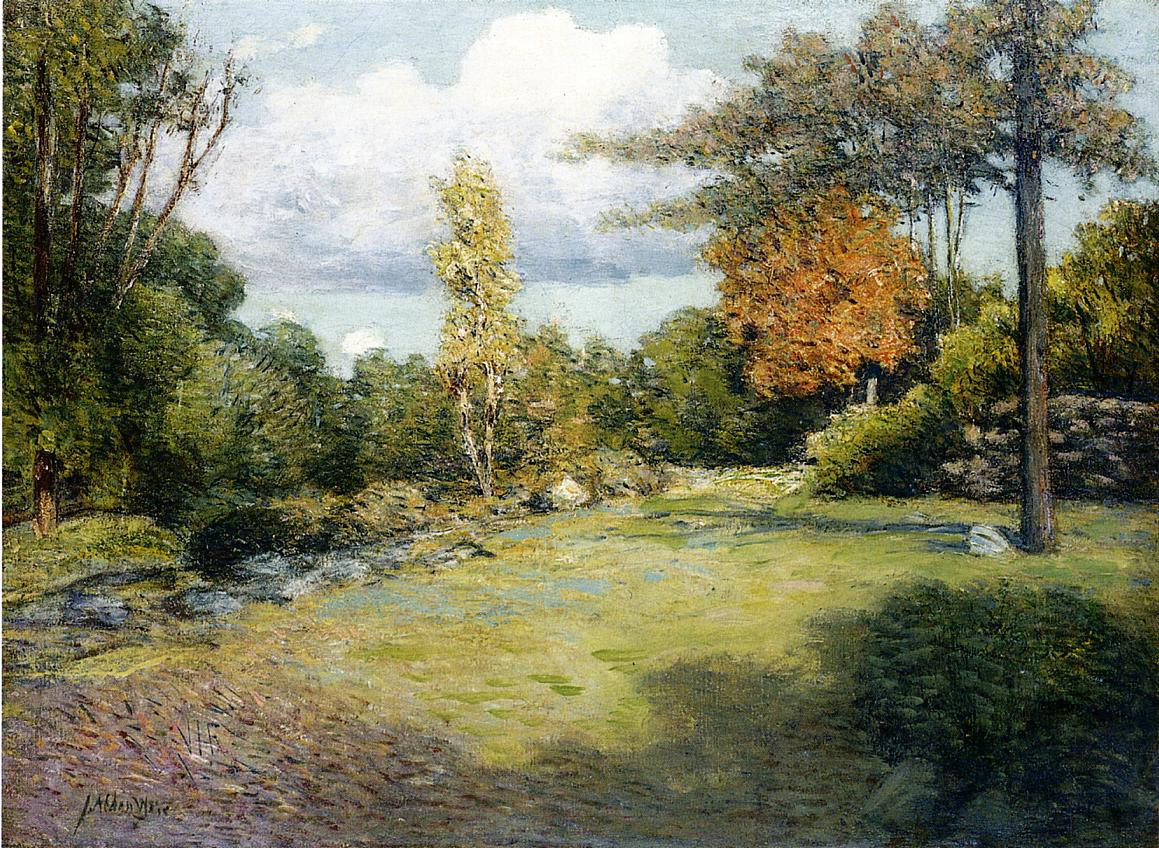
Autumn Days between circa 1900 and circa 1910
