= Theodore Scott-Dabo =

American painter

Theodore Scott-Dabo (November 16, 1865 - November 17, 1928) casually known as Scott Dabo, was a French/American tonalist landscape artist thought to be originally from Detroit, Michigan but now known to have been born in Saverne, France. Active both in New York and Paris, he was the younger brother of Leon Dabo. Both artists were Impressionist landscape painters, who shared in a similar manner in style and tone. During the period when they worked together, their subjects were usually landscapes and seascapes in the early morning or evening at twilight, they utilized spare composition and reductive color schemes to evoke what they termed, mood. The Dabo brothers style that had a Whistlerian quality, and like James McNeill Whistler both would come to be labeled Tonalist. The youngest brother in the family, Louis, a writer and publicist, also used the name Scott Dabo.

== History ==
The Dabo family lived in Detroit, Michigan between 1870 and the early 1880s under the surname of Schott. Both Theodore and his elder brother Leon were painters and received their initial artistic training from their father, Ignace Schott. Theodore's work, and that of his brother Leon, show the influence of James McNeill Whistler and J. M. W. Turner, whom the brothers discussed in their correspondence.

== Life ==
Theodore was the second of eight children, he and his older brother Leon were apprenticed to an artist according to the 1880 U.S. Census. The artist was of course their father. Ignace was primarily a church decorator, and did much work through his association with the Detroit Stained Glass Works, where he was employed until a year before his death, March 3, 1883. The brothers last appeared as Leon and Theodore Schott in the J. W. Weeks & Co., Detroit City Directory of 1883. In the late 1880s, Theodore relocated with the rest of the family to New York City and soon began using the hyphenated surname of Scott-Dabo, perhaps as a tribute to their father's birthplace Dabo, Moselle. Theodore and Leon joined together and utilizing the training they received from their father, formed L. D. & S. Dabo Decorator's. Leon, the motivating force of the two, developed a fairly successful business decorating Brooklyn churches and other institutions. Theodore, thought to be more of the family genius, was encouraged to pursue landscape painting. Though he signed his paintings, T. Scott-Dabo, most people referred to him simply as Scott Dabo. The brothers Dabo shared a studio in Greenwich Village, first on Broadway then on 14th Street.

Constantly having his work rejected from the juried exhibitions mounted by the art bodies of the day, Theodore struggled for many years without recognition. The art gallery owners would take no risk on an unknown person. With no outlet for exhibition, Theodore and his brothers, mounted private exhibitions of his work at the 14th St. studio. Finally, his work caught the attention of a few art critics who began to praise his paintings.

The French artist Edmond Aman-Jean had also taken noticed of his work and persuaded Theodore to return with him back to France.

In Paris, Theodore opened his studio at 8 Rue de la Grande Chamiere near the Luxembourg Garden. In the early weeks of October 1905, Theodore's paintings had their first public showing, beginning with the Salon d'Automne in Paris, then in a landscape exhibition at the National Arts Club in New York and in the Michigan Artist show at the Detroit Museum of Art. Much of this happened through the efforts of his brother Leon, who arranged joint exhibits of their work in New York, Boston, Detroit and Los Angeles. During much of 1905, Leon corresponded with the Director of the Detroit Museum of Art and offered Theodore's painting "The River Seine" as a gift for the Museum's collection.

The brothers' partnership was not to last as in early 1907, there was a highly publicized feud between Theodore and Leon, which was really more of a stunt arranged by the youngest brother, Louis Scott Dabo to aid the promotion of Theodore's work.

The publicity failed and records show that in the subsequent years only a single one-man exhibition of Theodore's work was mounted at the Morrey Art Galleries in Washington, D.C. Two or three of his paintings were included in group exhibits here in the U.S. and in Europe, but eventually Theodore disappeared from the art scene altogether. In 1928, Theodore Scott Dabo died in the country of his birth at Billiancourt, a suburb of Paris.

== Notes ==
N1: Like his brother Leon, the published year and place of his birth range widely. The first known record of Theodore Schott is from the ship manifest of the S.S. Silesia on January 5, 1870, which states he was from France and was 4 years old, thus born in 1865 or 1866. Both the 1870 and 1880 U.S. Census for Detroit, Michigan, record that Theodore was born about 1866 in France. The 1900 U.S. Census for the Bronx in New York, record that Theodore Scott-Dabo was born in October of 1867 in France. However, on his passport application in February 1905, he claims to be born in Detroit, Michigan in 1869. Various sources stated he was born in Detroit in 1870, born in New Orleans in 1877, then again in Detroit in 1879.
