= Grace Hazen =

American jewelry designer

Grace Hazen (1874-1940) was an American jewelry designer who founded the Hazen Crafts School at Rocky Neck, East Gloucester, Massachusetts. She specialized in hand-wrought jewelry.

== Early life ==
Grace Hazen was born in Cincinnati, Ohio in 1874. As a child, she learned carpentry skills and studied wood carving with William H. Fry.

== Education ==
She studied at Pratt Institute in Brooklyn, New York and the Chase School of Art in New York.

== Career ==
In the 1910s, Hazen gave lessons in jewelry design from her studio in the National Arts Club, New York. Following her studies, Hazen established a workshop in Tyringham, MA where she began producing hand-wrought jewelry. In 1916, she was awarded the life membership prize by the National Society of Craftsmen. She was on the executive board of the National Society of Craftsmen and president of the Metal Workers Guild. She was a member of the National Arts Club. Hazen died on in 1940 in Summit, New Jersey at the age of 65.

Her work is represented in the collection of Cooper Hewitt, Smithsonian Design Museum.
