= Ignace Schott =

French painter

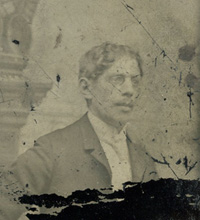
- Tintype portrait of Schott
- Born: July 27, 1818; Dabo, Moselle, France
- Died: March 3, 1883 (aged 64); Detroit, Michigan, US
- Known for: Mural painting, stained glass, etching
- Children: 8, including Leon and Theodore

Ignace Schott de Dabo (July 28, 1818 – March 3, 1883) was a French-born American painter, etcher and teacher. Born in Dabo, located in the Lorraine region of France, he was a successful ecclesiastic decorator. He worked mostly as a mural painter but also in stained glass and many of his creations have survived to this day. Much of his work from the mid 19th century was created in and around Saverne, France not far from Dabo, but the last thirteen years of his life and career Ignace worked in the Detroit, Michigan area of the United States. He is perhaps best known as the father of the tonalist painters Leon Dabo and Theodore Scott-Dabo.

== Life ==
None of his personal records are known to exist, thus little of Ignace's early life or artistic training is more than conjecture. Yet there are a few clues. One obituary stated that he was a pupil of Paul Delaroche. His eldest son Leon, also an artist who wrote and lectured on art, stated in an article on religious art that in "Detroit there was a talented Frenchman, Ignace Schott, who was a pupil of Delacroix". Leon also mentioned in some correspondence that his father was a "fellow student of J. M. Whistler's at Gleyre's studio". In a magazine article on stained glass, Leon wrote that Friederichs and Staffin of Detroit had a French designer in the 1870s (Leon's father) who had been trained by Champigneulle. These few hints do fit the timeline of when Ignace would have been studying at the beginning his career.

Much of Ignace's known works are ecclesiastic murals. One of Ignace's first teachers, Eugène Delacroix worked for many years in Paris on a number of mural commissions beginning in 1833. Ignace would have been fifteen years old then, an appropriate time for an apprenticeship. Paul Delaroche taught painting in Paris until 1843, and the Swiss painter Charles Gleyre took over Delaroche's studio and opened it to students twice a week for instruction. It is known that by 1846 Ignace was in Saverne and worked fairly extensively in the area through to 1869, he executed several works for the religious community there. The General Inventory of Cultural Heritage for Alsace lists a number of signed works on the walls of Saint Léger Church in Reinhardsmunster, Saint Gall Church in Siltzheim, Saint Florent Church in Weislingen, as well as a convent and bishop's residence near Saverne. A professor in Saverne from 1849 to 1869, Ignace seems to have also been a professor of aesthetics in Nancy at some point during these two decades. In the late 1850s, Ernest Delannoy and James McNeill Whistler traveled through Alsace-Lorraine, their friend of Dabo joined them on a few sketching excursions. It is possible that it was Ignace's workshop in Saverne where Whistler made some of the first etchings for The French Set. In the 1860s, Charles-François Champigneulle worked in stained glass and had his workshop in Metz, just north of Nancy and west of Dabo and Saverne, Ignace was in the right time and place to assist with Champigneulle's work restoring church windows that had been damaged during the revolution.

Ignace's relatives from Nancy, the writer, literary and art critic team of Edmond and Jules de Goncourt made their home in Paris, which naturally allowed Ignace access to such literary figures on the liberal Republican left as Victor Hugo and Jules Valles. Through his association with people like Hugo and Valles, then of course his connection to the politically liberal Gleyre, Ignace became very involved in the political arena. The university setting within which he had begun to work may have also stimulated his political activism. Ignace's son Leon would later write "my father founded with Jules Valles a republican newspaper secretly, and was in other ways obnoxious to the Emperor." An obituary of Ignace in the Boston Evening Transcript, states that he was "made a life sentence by Louis Napoleon".

It is probably due to his association with people like Valles, whom the government of Napoleon III imprisoned twice for press violations by 1868, that he began to feel uneasy with continuing to live in the politically tense France. During the early 1860s Ignace had married a young woman, Madeleine Oberle. Their first child, Leon, was born in 1864, Theodore followed the next year and their first daughter, Leontine came in 1867, and by 1868 Madeleine was pregnant once again. Escaping the political unrest of the Franco-Prussian War, Ignace and his young family fled to America, arriving in New York City on January 5, 1870. Trying to assimilate more easily the Schott family went first to French-speaking Canada, but by June 1870 they had settled in Detroit, Michigan with its large French community.

Most often known as Ignatius Schott in America, he continued to work as an ecclesiastic decorative artist. Some of his work can still be seen at St. Anne's Church, Most Holy Trinity Church and St. Joseph's Church in Detroit, St. Alphonsus in Windsor, Ontario and St. Boniface of All Saints Parish in New Riegel, Ohio. Numerous mentions were made in the 1870s and early 1880s Michigan newspapers of the work being created by Mr. Schott. The murals at St. Mary of Good Counsel in Adrian, Michigan was one of Ignace's first commissions in America. Then there was the scene from Hamlet he painted in 1875 on a "ten by twenty-eight canvas framed in an ornate cornice over the proscenium arch" at Whitney's Opera House. He did two large canvases for the sanctuary at St. Vincent de Paul's church, one being a depiction of the Holy Family the other was the death of St. Joseph, both paintings were completed for the reopening of the church at the Easter celebration in 1880. Later that same year Schott executed work at Holy Cross Church in Marine City and he or his eldest son painted the Stations of the Cross for St. Stanislaus Kostka church in Bay City. Most if not all of these works have since been either removed or destroyed.

Ignace was also employed for many years by the stained glass firm of Friederichs and Staffin, later known as the Detroit Stained Glass Works. There he created works like the imposing window The Trinity and The Redemption that is above the main altar of Most Holy Trinity Church. Ignace did non-ecclesiastic work as well and at least two of his paintings were in the private collection of Detroit architect Gordon W. Lloyd, the Alsatian Girl and Hebe, after Ary Scheffer. Early in 1876, Mr. Lloyd loaned the paintings to the Detroit Art Association for their first exhibition.

In order to keep his identity somewhat hidden, Ignace would invariably alter the spelling of his name. Not only would he and his family use Ignace, but also Ignatius, Ignatz, Ignaz and even Enoch and Engus. The family's surname has appeared as Schott, Schoote, Scott, de Dabo, D. Dabbo, Schott-Dabo, and Scott-Dabo. However, most of his work is either signed Ignace Schott or marked with his monogram, an insignia made with his initials apparently forming an anchor, much the way his young friend James McNeill Whistler would come to use his butterfly.

The eldest two of Ignace and Madeleine's eight children followed their father's profession and were artists of rare talent. Leon Dabo had a long and accomplished career both in America and Europe, yet the younger of the two, Theodore Scott-Dabo, though talented left almost no legacy. Ignace's sons received their initial artistic instruction from their father and both Leon and Theodore would also use a monogram to sign their work.

Schott died on March 3 1883, aged 64, in Detroit.

== Notes ==
N1: Jules Valles founded the newspaper, La Rue in 1867, then Le Peuple and le Refractaire in 1868.
