= The Pastellists =

The Pastellists was an organization of artists that formed in New York at the end of 1910 for the purpose of exhibiting artwork produced in the medium of pastel. The group helped organize four exhibitions in New York between 1910 and 1914 before disbanding in 1915. Some Pastellist members are credited with the initial idea for the exhibition that later became the 1913 Armory Show, the first major exhibition of European modernism in America.

== History ==
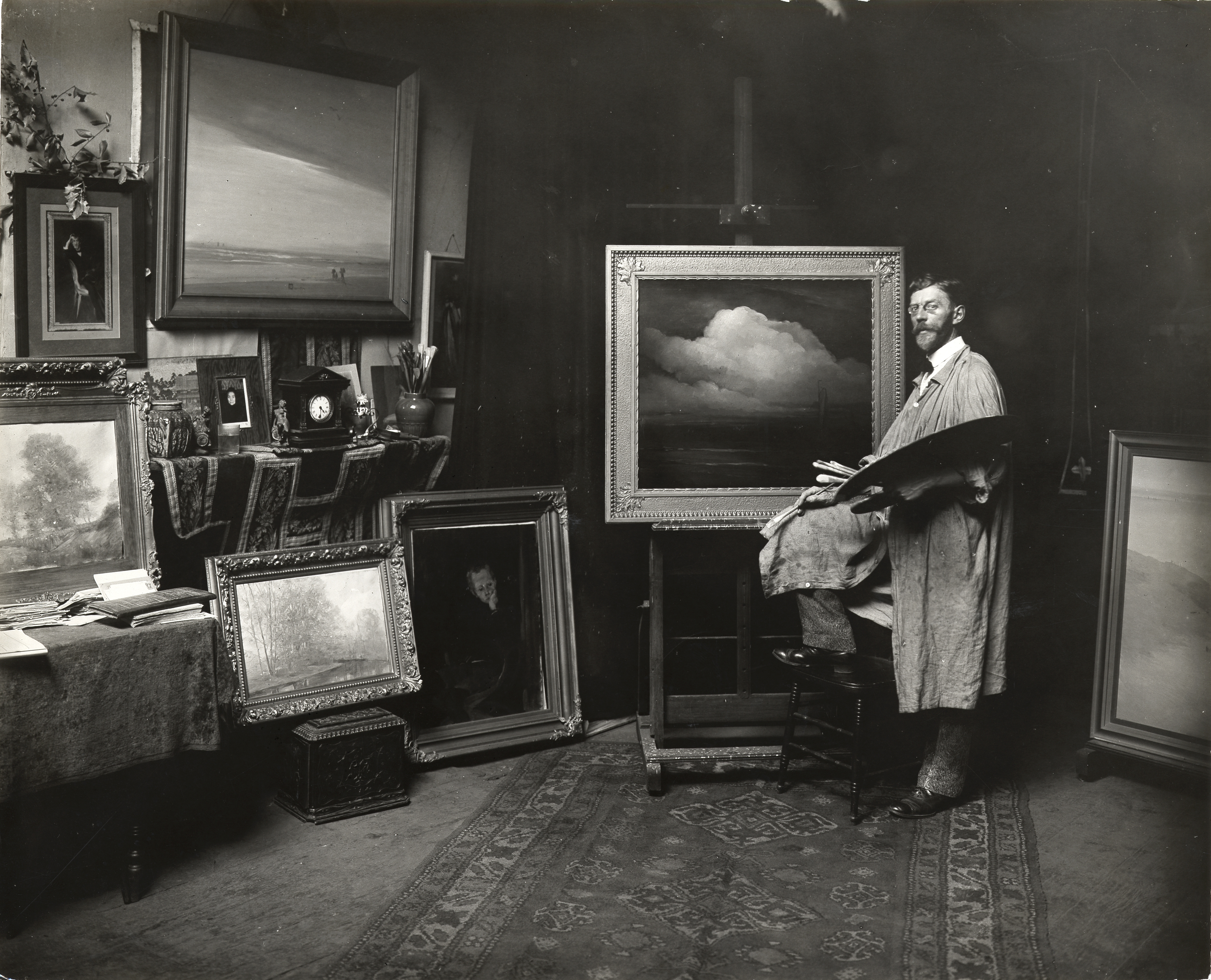
Leon Dabo in his studio, c. 1910

Many artists worked in pastel but few organizations were promoting or including pastel works in their annual exhibitions. The exhibit at the Rand School, organized by Leon Dabo in 1909 and the Exhibition of Independent Artists, organized by Robert Henri, in 1910, had fostered a desire among artists to present more personal work and exhibit irrespective of the expectations of conservative organizations like the National Academy. That year, Dabo became leader of The Pastellists.

A diary kept by the secretary/treasurer of the Pastellists, artist Elmer Livingston MacRae, records the activities of the young group during their first two exhibitions. The president was Leon Dabo and the Board of Control included Jerome Myers, Everett Shinn, and Juliet Thompson. Mr. Dabo engaged his lawyer and artist friend Henry Wellington Wack to draw up the papers for incorporation, which were agreed upon at a members meeting on February 15, 1911. There are no known records by MacRae or other artists of the member meetings or the later exhibitions.

The first two exhibitions, were held at the Folsom Galleries and according to the MacRae diaries, met with good reviews and high attendance. The New York Times said the second show "surpasses in interest its predecessor, which certainly was sufficiently charming." A "striking and important" work was L'enfant a l'orange by Mary Cassatt; Big Wave Design by Arthur Bowen Davies had "vigor and free handling, with the addition of a feeling for great rhythms".

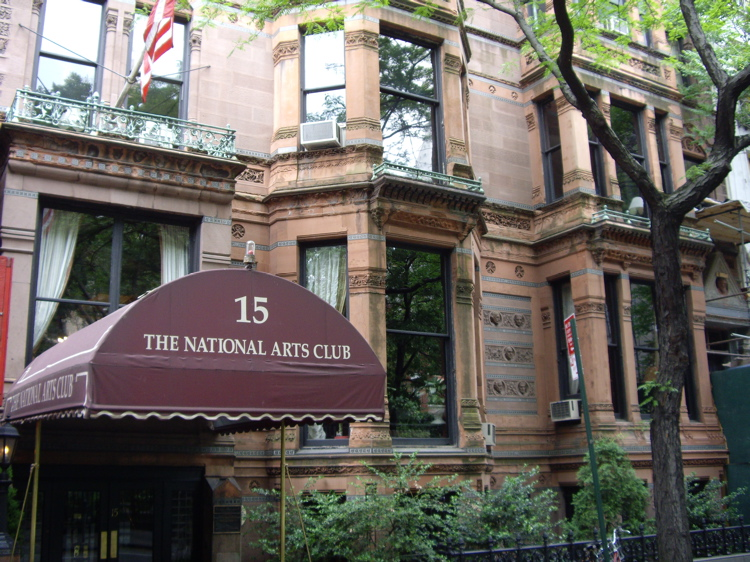
The National Arts Club, 15 Gramercy Park, New York City, venue for the fourth exhibition.

The daily newspapers chronicled the activities of the Pastellists and we do know that the third exhibition was held at Powell Art Gallery and artists like Arthur B. Davies, Walt Kuhn, and Edward Adam Kramer had become regular exhibitors. Guests like Gutzon Borglum showing some large figure works and Max Weber with "his cube forms, his weird women, his astonishing color schemes", caused such a stir that one critic wrote that the show was “the best exhibition yet held by the progressive and gifted artists constituting this group.”

The fourth exhibition, held at the National Arts Club, was a sister exhibit to a Contemporary Art Exhibition held in the main galleries at the same time.

Leon Dabo, Flowers in a Green Vase, pastel

By 1915 the American Art Annual listed the Pastellists as "Inactive." It is notable that several of the members of the Pastellists were the same activist artists that exhibited in the initial, non-juried MacDowell Club shows, again organized by Robert Henri. Many of these more radical artists came together to create the Association of American Painters and Sculptors, the group that mounted the infamous Armory Show of 1913.

An account states that one evening after a successful day at the second Pastellist exhibition, a few of the artists began to discuss forming a larger organization of artists, that would include not only easel painter but sculptors as well. The new organization was to exist for the express purpose of mounting large scale exhibitions, using the same progressive ideas of the Pastellists and the MacDowell exhibits, creating shows that would rival the more conservative juried exhibitions of the National Academy. Like the American Painters and Sculptors, the Pastellists may not have been in existence very long but the impact they had on the American art scene, reached far into the future.

== Pastel ==
Pastel is an art medium in the form of a stick, consisting of pure powdered pigment and a binder. The pigments used in pastels are the same as those used to produce all colored art media, including oil paints; the binder is of a neutral hue and low saturation. The color effect of pastels is closer to the natural dry pigments than that of any other process.

== Artists ==
Some of the artists involved with The Pastellists.

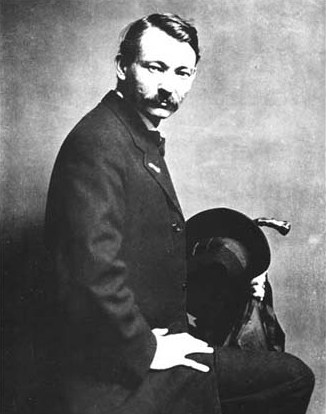
Robert Henri: his Exhibition of Independent Artists was a stimulus

Leon Dabo, leader of The Pastellists

Jerome Myers, on the Board of Control

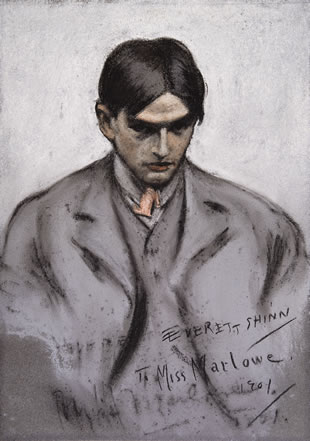
Everett Shinn, on the Board of Control

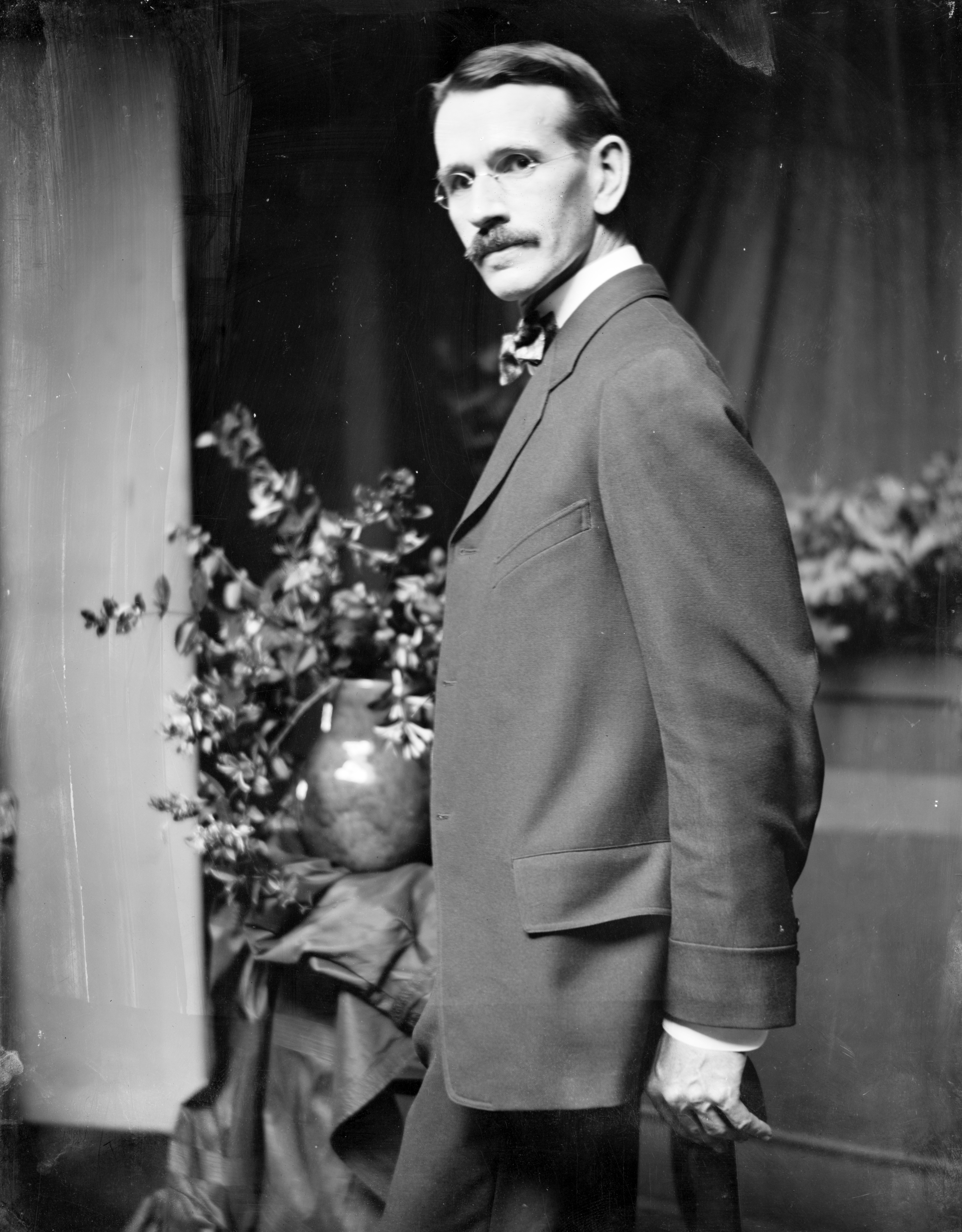
Arthur Bowen Davies, an exhibitor

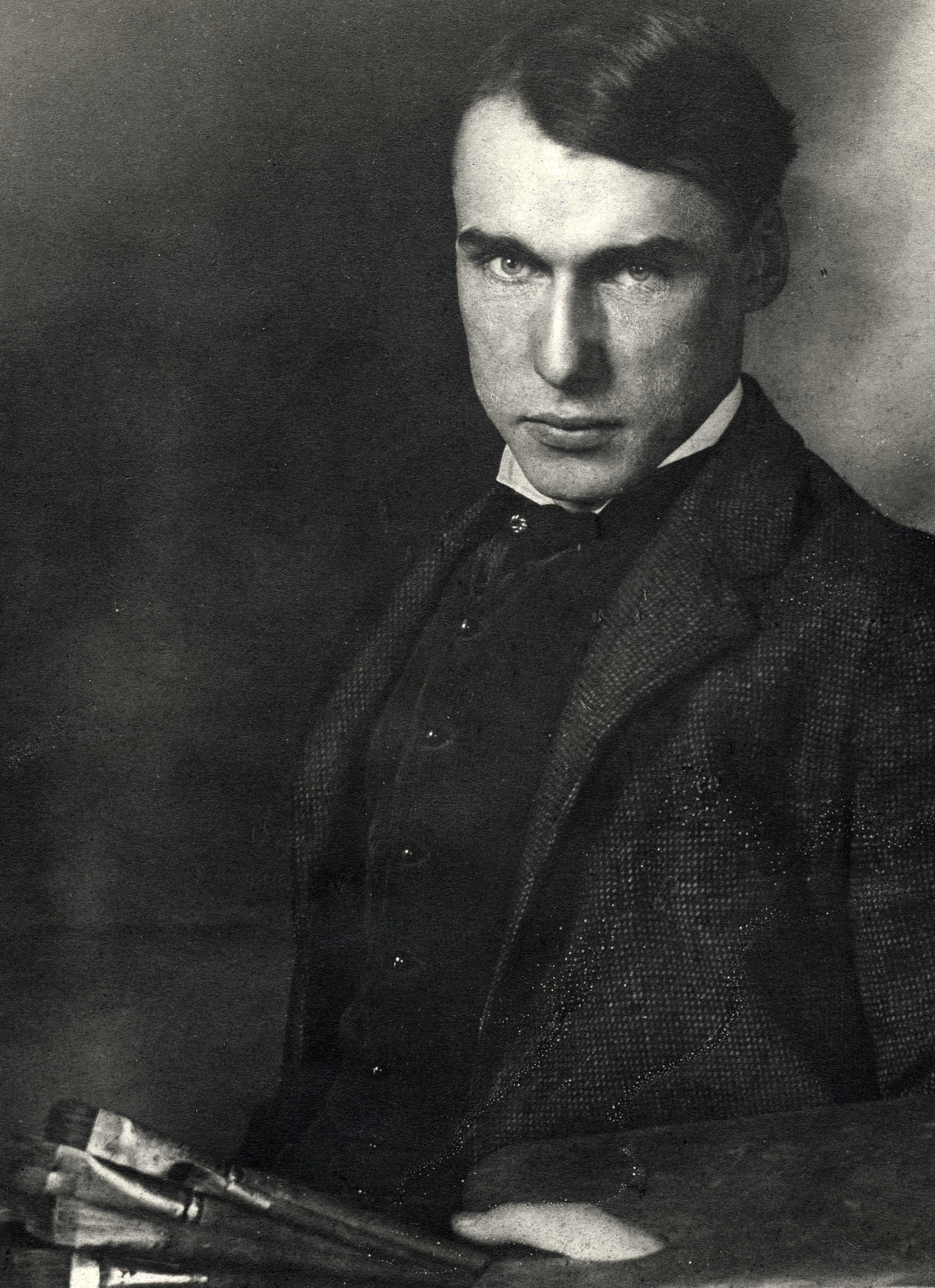
Walt Kuhn, a regular exhibitor

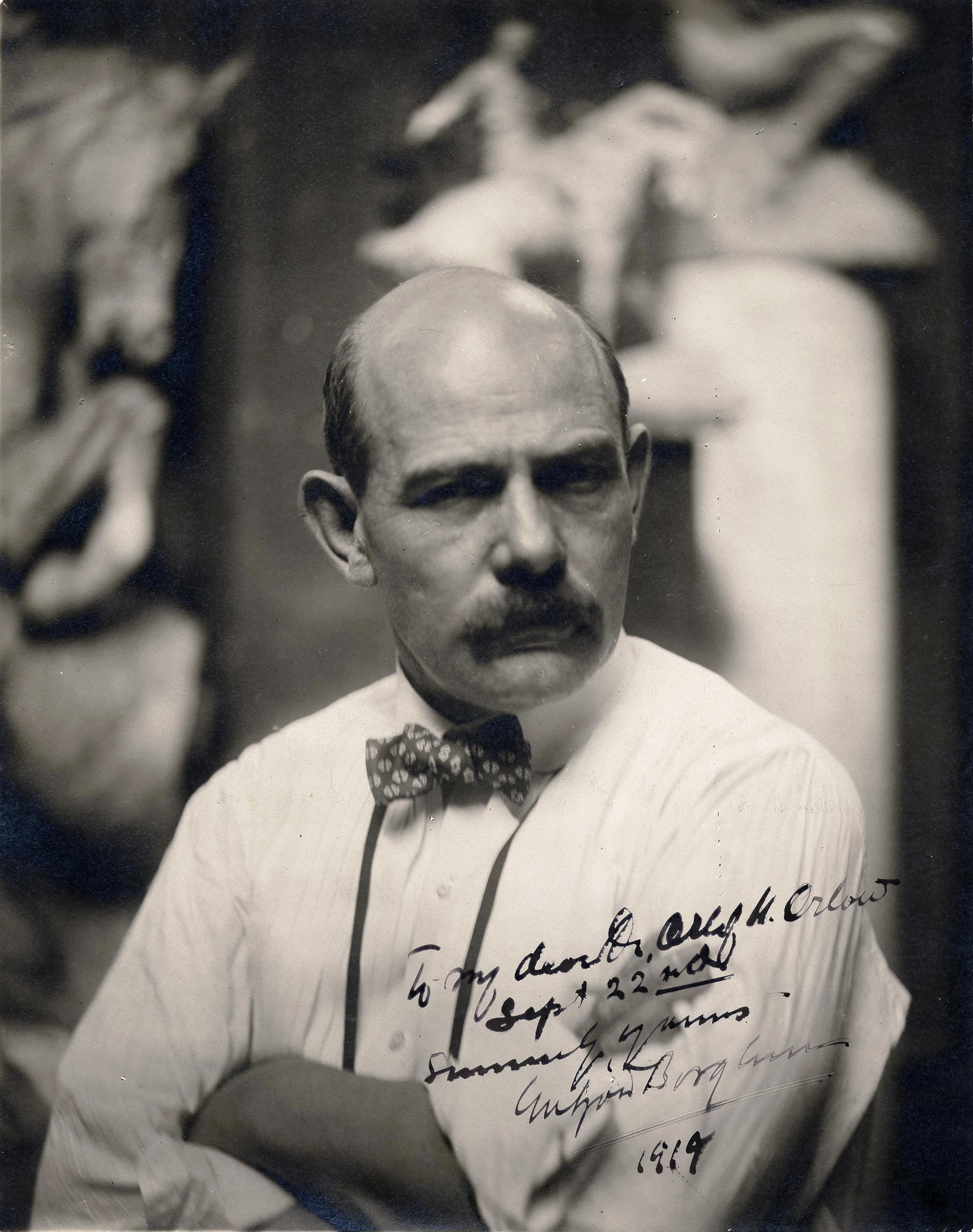
Gutzon Borglum, a guest exhibitor

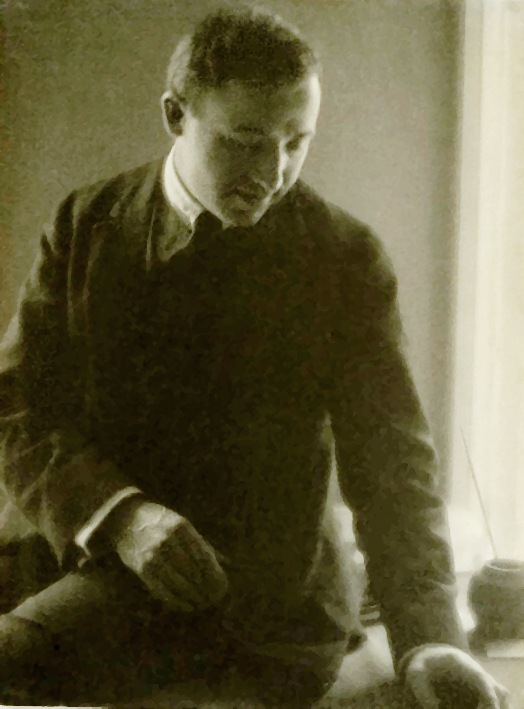
Max Weber, a guest exhibitor

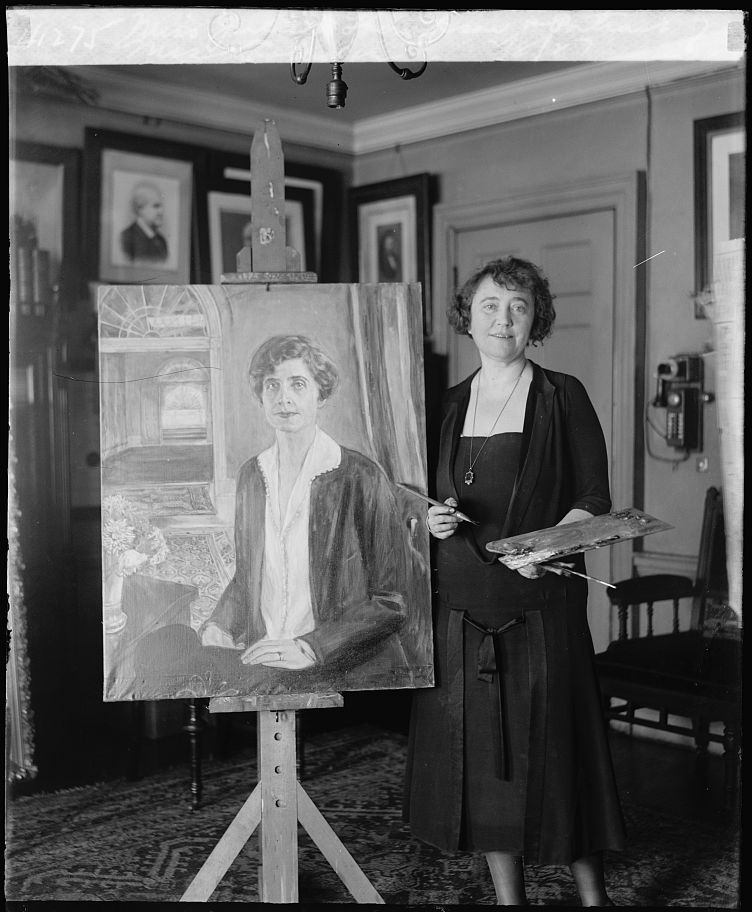
Juliet Thompson, On the 1910 Board of Control
