= Juliet Thompson =

American painter and Bahá'í

Juliet Thompson (1873–1956) was an American painter, and disciple of Baháʼí Faith leader ʻAbdu'l-Bahá. She is perhaps best remembered for her book The Diary of Juliet Thompson though she also painted a life-sized portrait of ʻAbdu'l-Bahá.

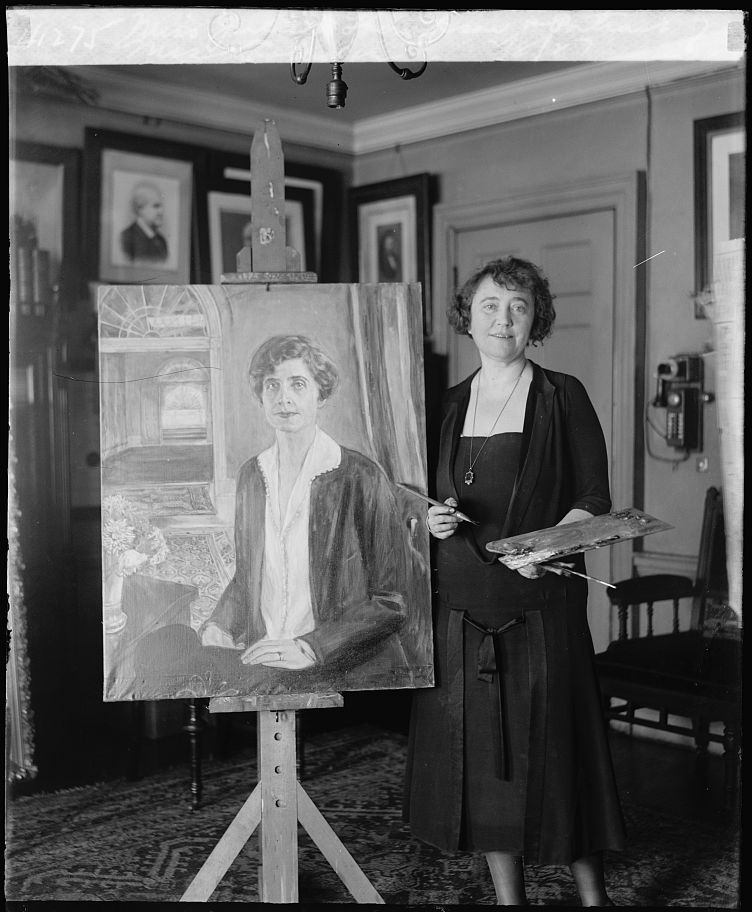
From the Library of Congress Photo Collection, Juliet Thompson with her portrait of First Lady Grace Coolidge

== Early life and education ==
Thompson was born in or near Washington, D.C., on 23 September 1873. Her parents, James W. Thompson and Celeste, sent her to the Corcoran School of Art (before it was renamed as a college). Her father died when she was 12 and left little money for the family, but Thompson was already able to sell paintings. Thompson was an active member of the community of artists in Washington, D.C., and painted a centerpiece of the 1897 Cosmos Club annual show.

== Baháʼí Faith ==
After learning of the Baháʼí Faith in Washington, D.C., near 1898 she traveled to Paris at the invitation of Laura Dreyfus-Barney's mother. Later in 1901 in Paris she met Thomas Breakwell, (see Baháʼí Faith in the United Kingdom), who gave her Arthur de Gobineau's description in French of the execution of the Báb which confirmed her faith. Paris is where Charles Mason Remey first met Thompson when she was taking classes on the religion from Mírzá Abu'l-Faḍl.

Among many talks ʻAbdu'l-Bahá gave in the United States he gave one at her residence on 15 November 1912 at 48 West Tenth Street, New York. At this meeting he described distinctive qualities of the religion.

During World War I she offered talks on the Baháʼí topic of The Most Great Peace. In the 1940s Thompson made several extended trips to Mexico to promulgate the religion. (See Baháʼí Faith in Mexico.)

=== Contact with artists ===
Thompson recalled Khalil Gibran, a neighbor and acquaintance of hers, and reports several anecdotes relating to Gibran: She recalls Gibran met ʻAbdu'l-Bahá a couple times circa 1911–1912.

In 1918 Mark Tobey came in contact with Thompson and posed for her. During the session Tobey read some Baháʼí literature and accepted an invitation to Green Acre where he converted.

O.Z. Whitehead attended an informational meeting of the religion in Thompson's home in 1950.

=== Portrait of ʻAbdu'l-Bahá ===
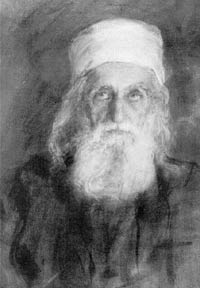
ʻAbdu'l-Baha by Juliet Thompson, painted in three sittings in June 1912

And during ʻAbdu'l-Bahá's first trip to the west in the fall of 1911 she met him at Thonon-les-Bains, France. During the second trip he reached New York - over several days he sat for a life-sized portrait starting June 1. Of the portrait, ʻAbdu'l-Bahá said "I want you to paint my servitude to God." On another day of sitting for the portrait, June 19, Thompson witnessed Lua Getsinger given a mission of conveying ʻAbdu'l-Bahá's status in the religion as the Center of the Covenant (see Will and Testament of ʻAbdu'l-Bahá) and that New York was the City of the Covenant (see perhaps 1992: Second Baháʼí World Congress.) The original of this life sized portrait has been lost, but there are original photographs of the portrait. A reproduction was on display at the Second World Congress, and one is housed in the Seat of the Universal House of Justice just outside its meeting room for the members.

=== Pilgrimages ===
Over her life she made two Baháʼí pilgrimages. Her first was in July, 1909 when she began her diary which was eventually published. Her work is a main source on ʻAbdu'l-Bahá's journeys to the West when he was in Europe in 1911 as well as some of his travels in the United States in 1912.

Thompson's second pilgrimage was in 1926.

== Death ==
Thompson died on December 4, 1956, at home in New Rochelle, New York. At the memorial service held for her at the Baháʼí House of Worship in Wilmette, several notable people spoke or sent messages – several Hands of the Cause and Paul E. Haney, Charles Mason Remey, Horace Holley, and Amelia Engelder Collins, and later Universal House of Justice member Charles Wolcott, as well as many notable Baháʼís.

== Painting ==
Thompson's first show as a portrait painter was at the Knoedler's galleries. Thompson worked as a portrait painter for years in Washington, D.C., and later in New York though she also had interests in other arts.

Circa 1898 to 1900 she undertook studies while in France and showed her work while there. On return to the States, Thompson moved to New York circa 1902. She was on the Board of Control of The Pastellists founded in 1910, which included Jerome Myers, and Everett Shinn – the president was Leon Dabo.

She also donated of her art for support of various causes - an early free clinic, Women's Suffrage, a project for minding children off street life, and relief for women and children in World War I.

Among the portraits she created are: Julia Dent Cantacuzène Spiransky-Grant, Hallie Davis, (wife of Stephen Benton Elkins), Rev. Percy Stickney Grant, Baroness Von Freytag-Loringhoven, Grace Coolidge, ʻAbdu'l-Bahá and Bahíyyih Khánum

== Writing ==
=== Books ===
- Thompson, Juliet; Marzieh Gail (1983). The diary of Juliet Thompson. Kalimat Press. p. 396. ISBN 978-0-933770-27-0.
- Thompson, Juliet (1998). Un maître persan à Thonon-les-Bains. Editions Nicolas Junod. p. 91.
- Thompson, Juliet (1939). Old Romania. C. Scribner's sons. p. 116.
- Thompson, Juliet (1939). Abdu'l-Baha: the center of the covenant. C. Scribner's sons. p. 116.
- Thompson, Juliet (1940). I, Mary Magdalen. Delphic Studios. p. 224.
- Thompson, Juliet; Marie Sterner Gallery (1941). Yugoslavia, Mexico, abstractions, Juliet Thompson. Marie Sterner Gallery.
- Thompson, Juliet; Marie Sterner Gallery (1940). Paintings of Romania, Juliet Thompson. Marie Sterner Gallery.

=== Articles ===
- Thompson, Juliet (August 1940). "The Valley of Love". World Order.
- Thompson, Juliet (March 1942). "ʻAbdu'l-Baha the Center of the Covenant". World Order.
- Thompson, Juliet (Fall 1971). "A Glimpse of the Master". World Order. 06 (1): 47–66.
- Thompson, Juliet; Gail, Marzieh (Summer 1978). "Juliet Remembers Gibran; As told to Marzieh Gail". World Order. 12 (4): 29–31.
