= Samuel J. Tilden House =

Historic house in Manhattan, New York

- U.S. National Register of Historic Places
- U.S. National Historic Landmark
- U.S. Historic district – Contributing property
- New York State Register of Historic Places
- New York City Landmark
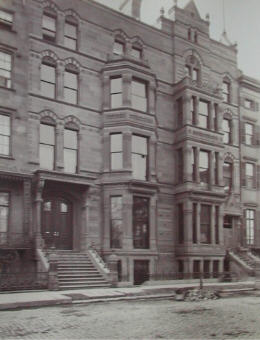
- (1872, before being combined and redone by Vaux)

- Location within Manhattan Location within New York Location within the United States
- Location: 15 Gramercy Park South, Manhattan, New York City, New York
- Coordinates: 40°44′15″N 73°59′14″W
- Built: c. 1840s; altered extensively 1884
- Architect: Calvert Vaux
- Architectural style: Gothic Revival
- Part of: Gramercy Park Historic District (ID80002691)
- NRHP reference No.: 76001251
- NYSRHP No.: 06101.002659
- NYCL No.: 0223

Significant dates
- Added to NRHP: May 11, 1976
- Designated NHL: May 11, 1976
- Designated NYSRHP: June 23, 1980
- Designated NYCL: March 15, 1966

The Samuel J. Tilden House is a historic townhouse pair at 14-15 Gramercy Park South in Manhattan, New York City. Built in 1845, it was the home of Samuel J. Tilden (1814–1886), former governor of New York, a fierce opponent of the Tweed Ring and Tammany Hall, and the losing presidential candidate in the disputed 1876 election. Tilden lived in the brownstone from 1860 until his death in 1886. From 1881 to 1884, Calvert Vaux combined it with the row house next door, also built in 1845, to make the building that now stands, which has been described as "the height of Victorian Gothic in residential architecture" with Italian Renaissance style elements. Since 1906 it has been the headquarters of the National Arts Club, a private arts club.

== Description and history ==
The Samuel J. Tilden House is located on the south side of Gramercy Park, facing the park across Gramercy Park South between Irving Place and Gramercy Park West. It is a four-story sandstone structure, its exterior finished mainly in pink sandstone with ashlar finish. Pink marble is used in the entrance surrounds, and shiny stone material studs some of the horizontal stringcourses. The building interior retains many Victorian features dating to the Vaux redesign, including parquet floors and floor-to-ceiling wood paneling. Further carved details have been preserved by the National Arts Club and are displayed in basement spaces.

The rowhouses were built in the 1840s, after Gramercy Park was laid out by Samuel B. Ruggles. Tilden acquired first Number 15, and later Number 14, in the 1860s, and lived in the combined units until his death. During these years, Tilden rose to prominence for successful battling the political machine of Tammany Hall in city politics, and became Governor of New York in 1875. He ran for president in 1876, winning the popular vote, but losing the electoral college to Rutherford B. Hayes in a politically controversial process. The election is widely considered to mark the end of Reconstruction after the American Civil War. In those tumultuous times, he had both rolling steel doors and a secret escape tunnel.

The house was extensively restyled in the 1880s by Calvert Vaux, transforming it from the Greek Revival to a more Italianate Victorian style. Since 1906, the house has been occupied by the National Arts Club, a private arts club. The building was designated a New York City landmark in 1966, and declared a National Historic Landmark in 1976. It is the only known residence associated with the life of Tilden. It is located in the Gramercy Park Historic District. It is next to the Players Club, also a National Historic Landmark.

== See also ==
- List of New York City Designated Landmarks in Manhattan from 14th to 59th Streets
- National Register of Historic Places listings in Manhattan from 14th to 59th Streets
- List of National Historic Landmarks in New York City
