= Saint Mary of Good Counsel Catholic Church (Adrian, Michigan) =

Historic church in Michigan, United States

- U.S. National Register of Historic Places
- Michigan State Historic Site
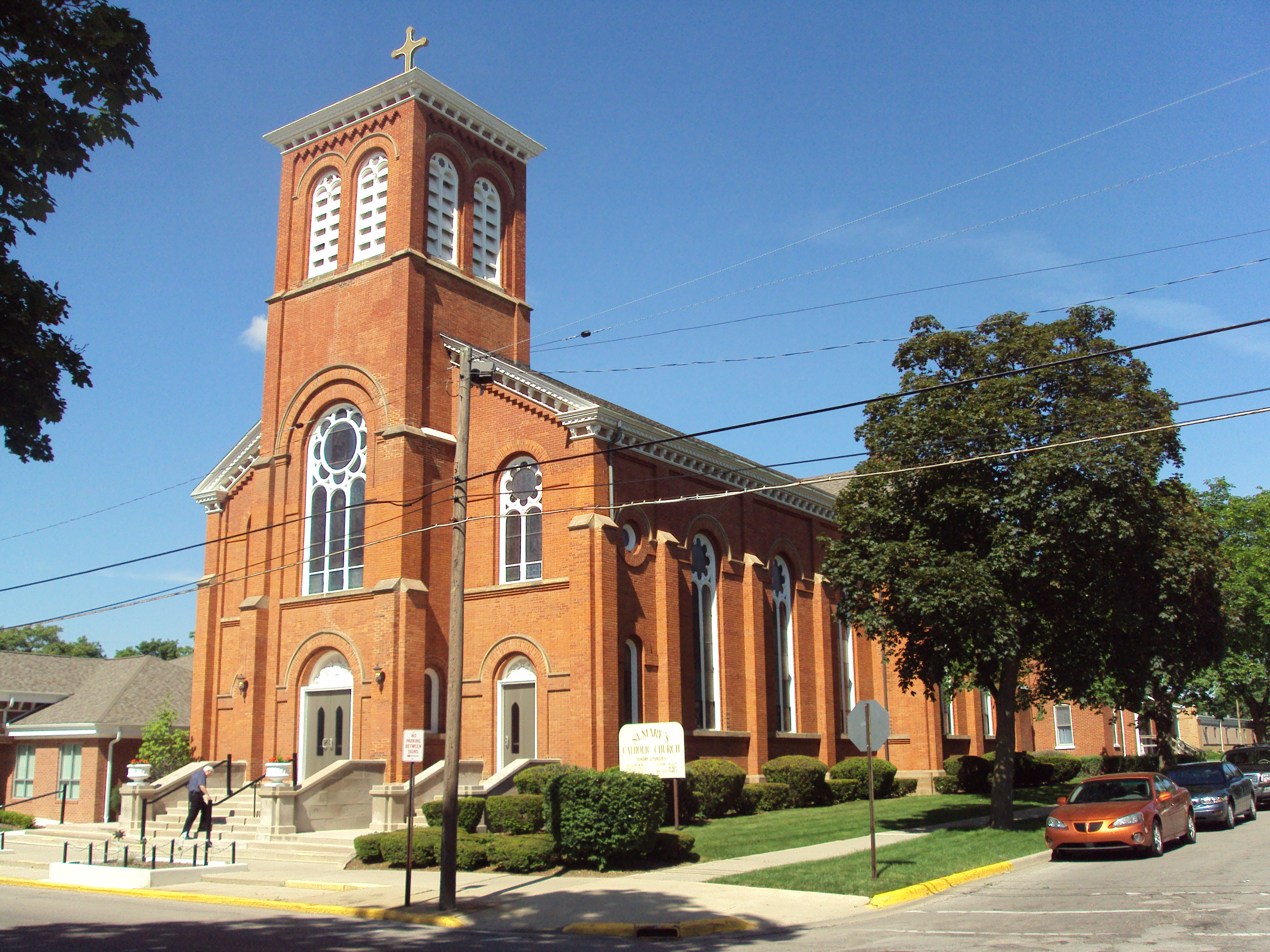

- Location within Michigan Location within the United States
- Interactive map
- Location: 305 Division Street; Adrian, Michigan
- Coordinates: 41°53′41″N 84°02′00″W
- Built: 1871
- Architect: Gordon W. Lloyd
- Architectural style: Romanesque Revival
- NRHP reference No.: 83000883
- Added to NRHP: February 24, 1983

Saint Mary of Good Counsel Catholic Church is an active church building located at 305 Division Street in the city of Adrian in Lenawee County, Michigan. It was listed on the National Register of Historic Places on February 24, 1983. It is also designated as a Michigan State Historic Site.

== History ==
Adrian's first Roman Catholic congregation was founded in 1840s and the first church constructed in 1852. That structure, however, was quickly outgrown, and in 1853 Father Peter Kindekins, then Vicar General of the Detroit Diocese, purchased land near the edge of town to construct a new church. By 1856, the site had a frame church, rectory, school, and convent. However, these buildings were completely destroyed by fire in 1863. Rebuilding was delayed over a debate on the site of the church. Eventually, the parish purchased this site, closer to the center of town, for a new parish complex.

The parish hired renowned Detroit architect Gordon W. Lloyd to design the new church. Construction began in 1872. The current church building was consecrated in 1871 and is recognized as an important landmark of Romanesque Revival architecture. Lloyd engaged Ignace Schott, an ecclesiastic artist, to execute several murals of important saints for the decoration of the interior. A new grade school was constructed in 1912, and a high school, Catholic Central High School, was constructed in 1953. The high school closed in 1968, and the grade school closed the following year. The church continues to serve the Catholic residents of Adrian.

== Description ==
Saint Mary of Good Counsel Catholic Church is a red-orange brick Italian Romanesque structure with stone trim, a sandstone foundation, and a partly projecting, centrally positioned, square, pyramid-roof bell tower. It has wooden cornices. Three front entrances are topped with round-headed, recessed panels with wooden relief carving.

On the interior, the church has a main vestibule and two smaller vestibules on the sides. Three sets of doors enter into the nave. In the auditorium, the interior is divided into nave and side aisles by four columns.
