= Chen Chi =

Chinese-American painter

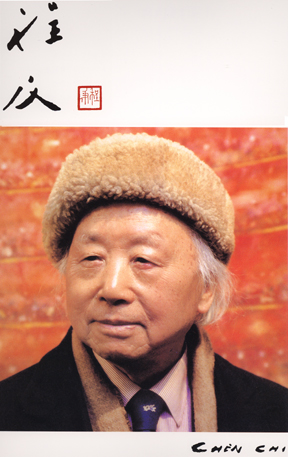
Artist Chen Chi in 1970.

Chen Chi (Chinese: 程及 1912–2005) was a renowned Chinese-American painter who lived and worked for much of his career in the United States.

Chi was born in Wuxi, Jiangsu, China in 1912. He taught painting at the Wu Pen and Huai Chiu high schools for girls from 1938 to 1944, and at the St. John's University School of Architecture in Shanghai from 1942 to 1946. He first began exhibiting his work in annual art exhibitions in Shanghai in 1940.

In 1947, Chi relocated to the United States through a cultural exchange program to paint and exhibit his work. His first one-man show in the United States was at the Village Art Center in New York City in 1947. Chi lived and worked at the National Arts Club in New York for 40 years, and in 1966 received the National Arts Club Gold Medal for Lifetime Achievement. In 1954 he was elected into the National Academy of Design as an Associate Academician, and became a full Academician in 1964.

Chi's works have been shown extensively throughout the United States including at the Portland Museum of Art in Maine and the Museum of Fine Arts, Houston (1948); the Miami Beach Art Center (1952); the La Jolla Art Center and the Witte Museum (1953); the Charles and Emma Frye Art Museum in Seattle (1955); the Museum of Outdoor Arts, where his work is part of their collection as well as their sister museum, The Madden Museum, where founders of both museums, John and Marjorie Madden were major collectors of his work. Internationally, you can find his work at the National Taiwan Museum of Art in Taichung. He was the first living Chinese artist to be honored with a one-man retrospective of his oeuvre at Versailles, in conjunction with the first World Cultural Summit in June 2000.

In addition to watercolors, Chi also worked as an illustrator, his illustrations appearing in the Ford Motor Company Magazine (1950 & 51); Collier's (1951 & 52); Sports Illustrated (1955 & 60); and Horizon (1958). Chi published numerous books featuring his works including Chen Chi - Paintings (1965); Two or Three Lines from the Sketchbooks of Chen Chi (1969); China from the Sketchbooks of Chen Chi (1974); Chen Chi: Watercolors, Drawings, Sketches (1980); Chen Chi Watercolors (1981); and Heaven and Water: Chen Chi (1983).

The Chen Chi Art Museum opened in Shanghai in 1999 on the campus of Shanghai Jiao Tong University, to display Chen Chi’s works and promote an international exchange of art and education. The museum was dedicated by Communist Party's general secretary, Jiang Zemin, an avid collector of Chi's paintings, who wrote the dedicatory inscription “Chen Chi Art Museum” as an act of personal respect and tribute to the artist. A smaller Chen Chi Museum was also opened in his birthplace of Wuxi. Later that year, Chi was invited to create a special work to celebrate the 50th Anniversary of the People's Republic of China.

Chi died in 2005. In addition to his artwork in Shanghai, a collection of his papers is at Syracuse University,

== External Resources ==
- Chi Chen papers, 1946-1972. Archives of American Art, Smithsonian Institution.

This article incorporates public domain material from websites or documents of the Bureau of Reclamation.
