= Leon Dabo =

American painter (1864–1960)

- Dabo in 1909, photo by E.O. Hoppé
- Born: July 9, 1864; Saverne, France
- Died: November 7, 1960 (aged 96); New York City, United States
- Known for: Painting
- Movement: Tonalism
- Awards: 1934, made Chevalier of the Légion d'honneur, France

Leon Dabo (July 9, 1864 (Note: The year and location of his birth varies widely. Contemporaneous sources state he was born in Detroit in 1868, in 1869, in 1870, or in Grosse Pointe in 1874. A 1931 Time article even states that he was born into a French Canadian family. His tombstone even has 1868 carved on it. In recent years some research has stated that he was born in Paris in 1865. Yet in France, a genealogical and research association known as ARFIDO, has indexed the individuals from the Alsace Lorraine region who claimed French nationality in 1872. Leon's father, Ignace Schott, and his four eldest children declared their French citizenship on July 24, 1872.) – November 7, 1960) was an American tonalist landscape artist best known for his paintings of New York State, particularly the Hudson Valley. His paintings were known for their feeling of spaciousness, with large areas of the canvas that had little but land, sea, or clouds. During his peak, he was considered a master of his art, earning praise from John Spargo, Bliss Carman, Benjamin De Casseres, Edwin Markham, and Anatole Le Braz. His brother, Scott Dabo, was also a noted painter.

== Early life ==
Flowers in a Green Vase, Pastel

Dabo, the eldest of three brothers (he also had five sisters), was possibly born in Paris, France but recently available documents state he was born in Saverne. His father Ignace Scott Dabo was a professor of aesthetics and a classical scholar, who moved the family to Detroit, Michigan in 1870 to escape the Franco-Prussian War. He supplemented Leon's formal education with Latin, French, and drawing. After his father's death in 1883, the Dabo family moved to New York City, whereupon he found a job as an architectural designer, working to support the family so that his younger brother Scott, who was considered the talented one, could focus on his art. He then became a student of John LaFarge, and the two of them would remain close friends until LaFarge's death. When Dabo decided to pursue studies in Paris, LaFarge wrote letters of introduction, enabling Dabo to meet Pierre Puvis de Chavannes, who would become his mentor, and to gain entry to the École nationale supérieure des arts décoratifs. He also studied part-time at the Académie Colarossi and the École des Beaux-Arts. Although Impressionism was gaining hold at this time, Dabo did not find that movement to his taste.

Dabo also studied briefly at the Academy of Fine Arts Munich, but the nascent form of German Expressionism did not appeal to him and he moved on to Italy, where he stayed for three years. This was followed by a year in Nancy, France, studying color with Émile Lauge, a physicist. Finally, he spent some time in London around 1886, where he made the acquaintance of James Abbott McNeill Whistler, who also apparently was a fellow student of Marc-Charles-Gabriel Gleyre with Dabo's father. Whistler would have a profound influence on Dabo's style.

While in London, Dabo met Mary Jane "Jennie" Ford, they married in 1889 and the couple had two children: Madeleine Helen (b. 1891) and Leon Ford "George" (b. 1892), Leon and Jennie would separate in the 1920s. After Jennie's death in 1945, Dabo officially married his "wife" since the 1930s, Stephanie Ofenthal.

== Artistic success ==
He returned in New York in 1890 and began his career as a muralist, but by the beginning of the 20th century had turned to painting landscapes instead. For years, Dabo's paintings were rejected for exhibition by the major juries of the United States, until respected French painter Edmond Aman-Jean recognized his talents and began showing Dabo's work in France, whereupon he became a major success. His work was on display in museums all around the world, including Musée du Luxembourg, the National Gallery of Canada, the National Gallery of Art in Washington, the Metropolitan Museum of Art in Manhattan, and the Museum of Fine Arts in Boston. Noted critics such as Sadakichi Hartmann, Royal Cortissoz and J. Nilson Laurvik showered praise on his paintings.

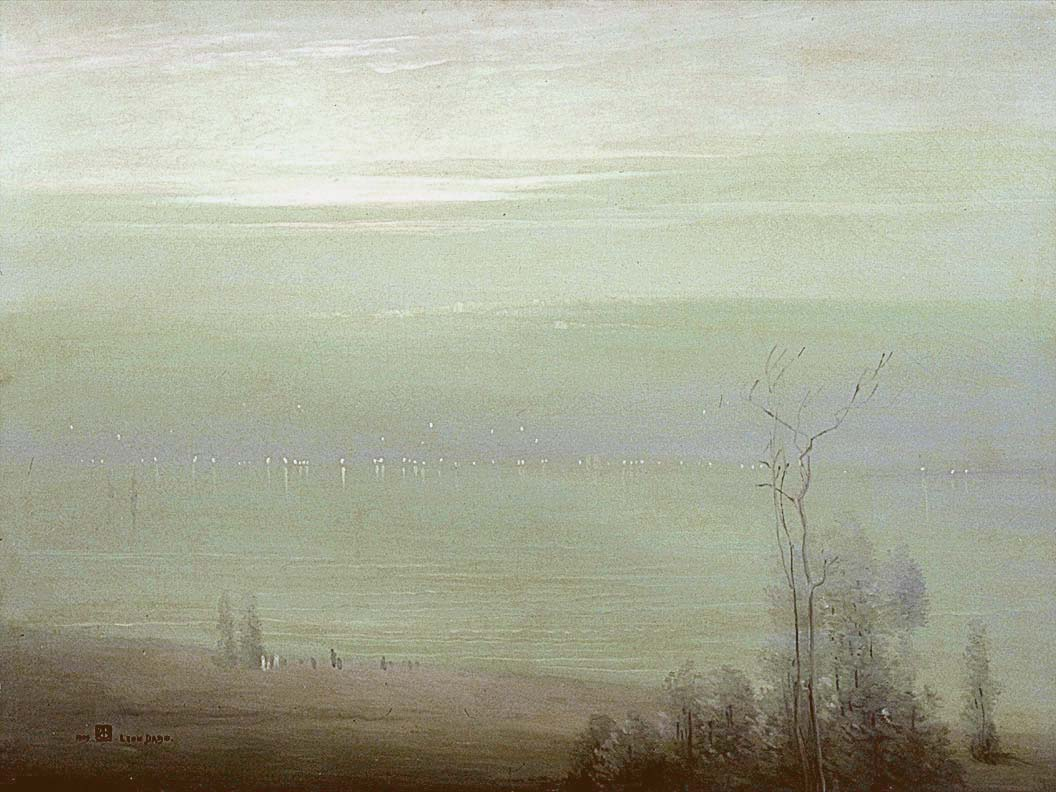
Evening on the Hudson (1909), oil on canvas. This painting won a prize from the National Arts Club.

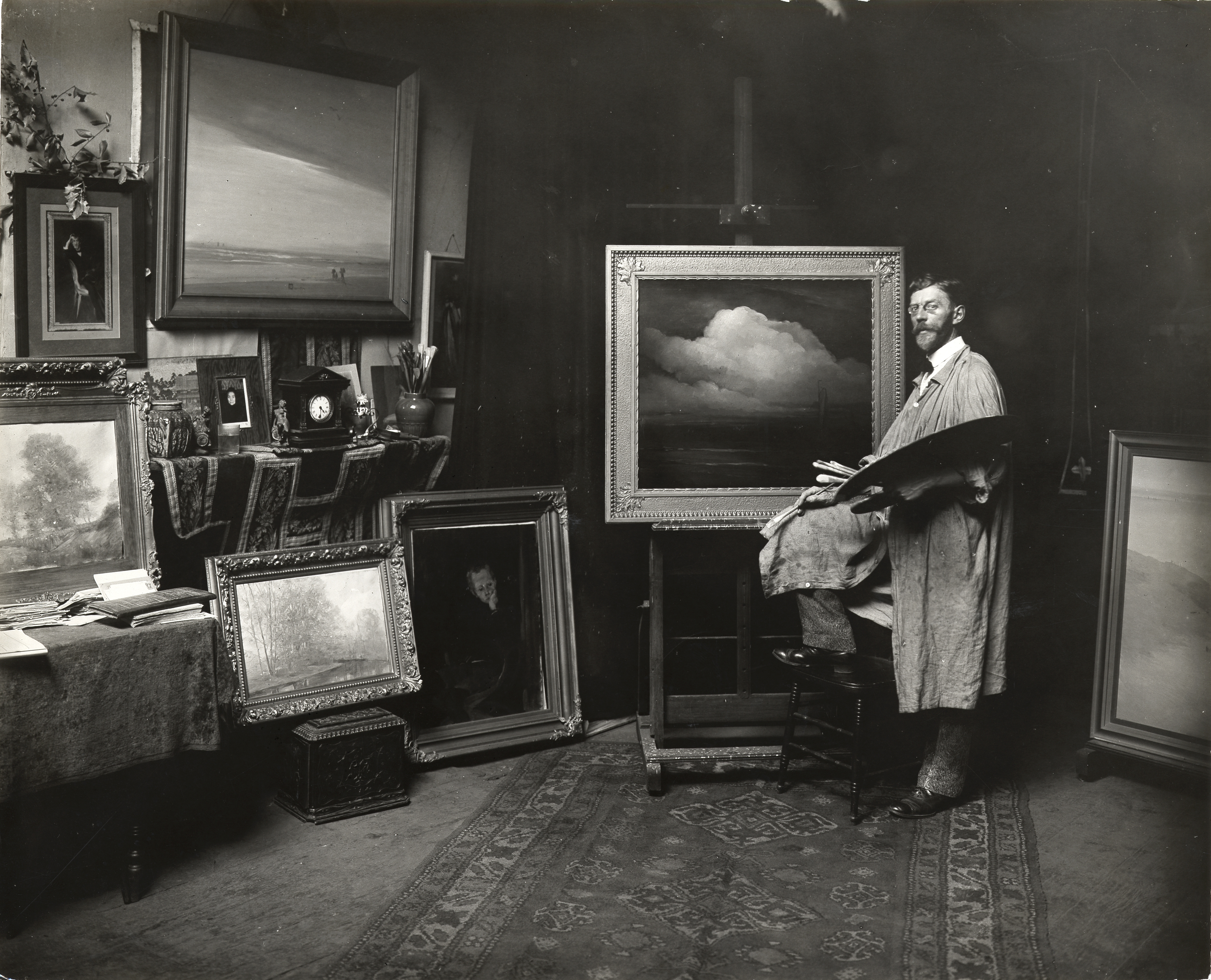
Leon Dabo in his Brooklyn studio, ca. 1910, from the Archives of American Art

As Dabo's success grew, it was met with by jealousy on the part of Scott. By all accounts, Leon consistently championed his brother's work and the two of them often exhibited together. He even held power of attorney to act as Scott's representative with prospective buyers in Europe. When Scott went to study in Paris in 1902, Leon wrote letters of introduction on his behalf. However, reviews in the press were usually more favorable to Leon, buyers were more interested in Leon's work, and it sold for more as well. Finally at one point, the youngest brother Louis returned from Europe with a new power of attorney statement placing himself in charge of Scott's work, charging that Leon had imitated Scott's style, undermined him with buyers, and misappropriated the proceeds from the sales of Scott's work. Although the Dabo sisters sided with Louis and Scott, Leon simply refuted the charges and The New York Times did not put much stock into Louis' statements.

Aligning himself with the insurgents of the art world, Dabo participated in the "Exhibition of Contemporary Art" at the National Arts Club in 1908. Later that year he showed with the Allied Artists' Association, a newly organized artist group in London mounting non-juried exhibitions. In 1909 he curated and participated in an art exhibition for the Rand School of Social Science and in 1910, he participated in the "Exhibition of Independent Artists" held by members of the Ashcan School. In that same year Dabo became the leader of The Pastellists, a somewhat radical artist exhibition society. He was an initial exhibitor at the MacDowell Club in their non-juried exhibitions, the brainchild of the Ashcan School's Robert Henri. A charter member of the Association of American Painters and Sculptors, Dabo was a principal organizer of the International Exhibition of Modern Art in 1913, better known as the Armory Show. He hosted several of its earliest meetings in his studio, but he was back in Europe before the show opened.

== World War I ==
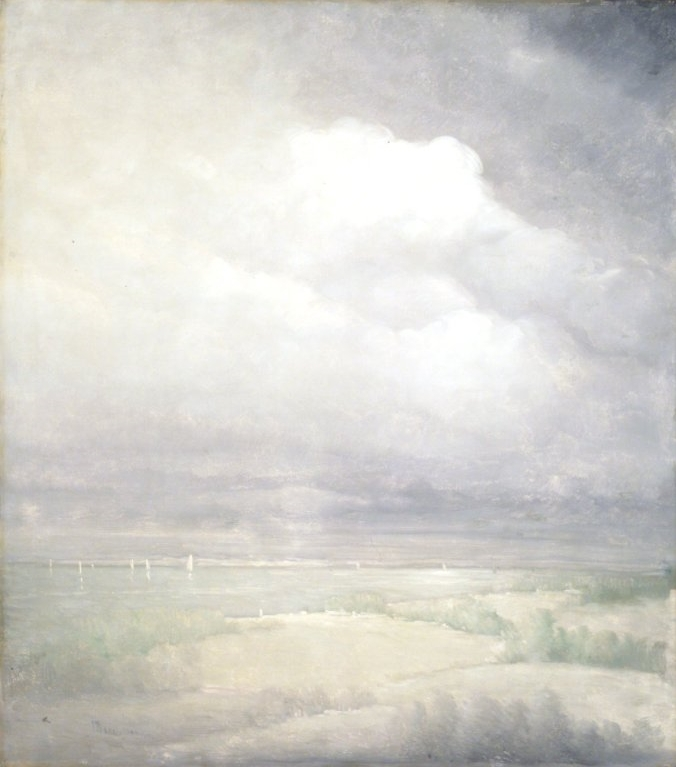
Silver Light Hudson River (1911), oil on canvas. Brooklyn Museum.

During World War I, the multilingual Dabo went to France and offered his services to Prime Minister Georges Clemenceau. He ended up serving as an officer in the French and British Armies successively and exposed a number of German spies, using his ear for dialect and accent. He even played the role of spy once, going behind German lines to gain information. For the U.S., he was part of a commission that investigated alleged atrocities that happened in France during the course of the war, and reported that they were indeed true. He was commissioned as a captain in the United States Army and served as an interpreter for the American Expeditionary Force as well as an aide-de-camp to Major General Mark L. Hersey of the 4th Infantry Division.

== Later life ==
After the war, his artistic output decreased. He began to feel that American men had become too materialistic, but women, he felt, were of a more spiritual nature, and could "save" art from indifference. As a result, he became a popular lecturer, often speaking to as many as fifteen women's clubs a month on art all around the country.

In the 1920s, he taught and painted in various artists' colonies in the Litchfield Hills of Connecticut. Starting in 1933, he began to exhibit flower paintings and pastels, a departure from the landscapes with which he had become associated. They were well received, with The New York Times saying the works were "a distinct contribution to be associated with the flower harmonies of Odilon Redon and of Fantin-Latour."

In 1937, he returned to France and established a studio there, where he painted French landscapes. With war approaching, Dabo helped artists such as Walter Sickert and Fernand Léger transport their works out of the country to avoid their being confiscated. He escaped the German occupation of France in late 1940, through Portugal. After the war, he returned to France in 1948 and painted more landscapes, most notably of Montagne Sainte-Victoire. These paintings were highly received and he was invited to exhibit them at the "Painters of Mont Ste. Victoire: Tribute to Cézanne" show in 1951. That year, he returned to the United States for the last time.

Dabo died in Manhattan in 1960 at the age of 96. He is buried in Long Island National Cemetery. Today his works are still getting attention and praise. A great deal of interest has been made on his late modern landscapes and floral still life.

== Honors and associations ==
- Chevalier, Légion d'honneur for his contribution to art
- National Academy of Design, New York
- Société Nationale des Beaux-Arts, Paris
- Société des Amis des Arts, Versailles, silver medal
- Allied Artists' Association, London
- President of The Pastellists, New York
- The New-York Historical Society
- Four Arts Society, New York
- University Club, Paris
- Association of Italian Artists, Florence, Italy
- Life Member of the National Arts Club, New York

== Exhibitions ==
=== Selected solo exhibitions ===
- 1906 Anderson Art Gallery, Chicago, IL
- 1906 Rowlands Gallery, Boston, MA
- 1906 Blanchard Gallery, Los Angeles, CA
- 1906 National Arts Club, New York, NY
- 1907 Academy of Fine Arts, Chicago, IL
- 1907 A.R. Kohlman Gallery, Indianapolis, IN
- 1907 Poland Spring Art Gallery, ME
- 1907 Fritz Gurlitt Gallery, Berlin, Germany
- 1908 Allied Artists Association Ltd., London, England
- 1908 Gouplil Gallery London, England
- 1908 Gurlitt Gallery, Berlin, Germany
- 1909 National Arts Club, New York, NY
- 1909 Muncie Art Association, Muncie, IN
- 1909 Charleston Gallery, Saginaw, MI
- 1910 Reinhardt Galleries, Chicago, IL
- 1910 Bruno Cassirer Gallery, Berlin, Germany
- 1911 Pennsylvania Academy of Fine Arts, Philadelphia, PA
- 1911 Walker Gallery, Montreal, Canada
- 1911 Exhibition of Recent Paintings Otto Fukushima, Elite Art Rooms, New York, NY
- 1911 MacDowell Club, New York
- 1912 Powell Art Gallery
- 1912 Folsom Galleries, New York, NY
- 1912 Coffier Art Galleries, New York
- 1912 Corcoran Gallery, Washington, DC
- 1912 Pennsylvania Academy of Fine Arts, Philadelphia, PA
- 1913 Gougland Drimi Fisher & Co., London, England
- 1916 Goupil Galleries, New York, NY
- 1917 Exhibition of Paintings by Leon Dabo Goupil Galleries
- 1918 An Exhibition of Oils by Leon Dabo Art Institute of Chicago
- 1920 Long Island Painters Plymouth Institute, New York
- 1931 Ferargil Galleries, New York, NY
- 1933 Knoedler Galleries, New York, NY
- 1938 Galerie Zak, Paris, Francis
- 1941 Ferargil Galleries, New York, NY
- 1962 Graham Gallery, New York, NY Retrospective
- 1963 Retrospective University of Michigan Museum of Art, Ann Arbor, MI
- 1964 Leon Dabo Davis Galleries, New York, NY
- 1999 Leon Dabo: A Retrospective D. Wigmore Fine Art, Inc., New York, NY
- 2012 Drawings of Leon Dabo, Sullivan Goss, An American Gallery, Santa Barbara, CA
- 2014 In defense of Beauty, The Florals of Leon Dabo, Sullivan Goss, An American Gallery, Santa Barbara. CA
- 2014 Leon Dabo: Jolie Fleurs, Lawrence Fine Art, East Hampton, NY
- 2017 Light Fall, Sullivan Goss, An American Gallery, Santa Barbara. CA
- 2022 Leon Dabo: En France Encore, Sullivan Goss, An American Gallery, Santa Barbara

=== Selected group exhibitions ===
- 1901 National Academy of Design
- 1901 Annual Exhibition Carnegie International
- 1903 Annual Exhibition Carnegie International
- 1906 Annual Exhibition Art Institute of Chicago
- 1907 Academy of Fine Arts, Pennsylvania
- 1908 Applied Artists Association Ltd, London, England
- 1909 National Arts Club, New York, NY
- 1910 Royal Academy, Berlin, Germany
- 1910 Exhibition of Independent Artists, New York, NY
- 1911 Pennsylvania Academy of Fine Arts
- 1911 Worcester Art Museum, MA
- 1911 MacDowell Club, New York, NY
- 1911 Art Institute of Chicago
- 1912 Association of Italian Artists, Palazzo Strozzi, Florence, Italy
- 1912 Worcester Art Museum, MA
- 1912 Powell Art Gallery
- 1912 Corcoran Gallery, Washington, DC
- 1913 Armory Show, New York, NY
- 1913 Armory Show, The Art Institute of Chicago.
- 1919 Ardsley Studios, Brooklyn, NY
- 1920 Knoedler Gallery, New York, NY
- 1923 Annual Exhibition Penn. Academy of Fine Art
- 1925 Annual Exhibition Penn. Academy of Fine Art
- 1938 Salon d'Automme, Paris, France
- 1938 Societe Nationale de Beaux Arts, Paris, France
- 1938 Societe des Artistes Independents, Paris, France
- 1938 Cornell University, Ithaca, NY
- 1939 Jeunes Artistes Francais "Jeunes Artistes Francais," London Fourth Fidac Salon, American Section, London, England
- 1939 Salon des Tuileries, Paris France
- 1939 Societe Nationale de Beaux Arts, Paris, France
- 1939 London Group Show with French Artists, London, England
- 1939 Societe des Amis des Arts, Versailles, France (Silver Medal, "Marine, La Plage, Normandie")
- 1939 Exhibition Celebrating Opening of Albert Canal, Liege, Belgium
- 1951 Painters of Mont Ste.-Victoire: Tribute to Cézanne Musee Graner, Aix-en-Provence, France
- 1951 Painters of Mt. Ste. Victoires Tribute to Cézanne
- 1960 Fiftieth Anniversary: Artists in 1910 Delaware Art Center, Wilmington, DE
- 1961 National Academy of Design
- 1961 Montclair in Manhattan, The Hirschl & Adler Galleries, New York, NY
- 1982 Tonalism: An American Experience The Grand Central Art Galleries, New York, NY
- 1988 75th Anniversary Armory Show, New York, NY
- 1990 Americans and Paris, The Colby Museum of Art, Waterville. ME
- 1994 New York: A Magnet for Artists, The Brooklyn Museum, NY
- 1997 American Tonalism Metropolitan Museum of Art, New York, NY
- 1999 Leon Dabo: A Retrospective, D. Wigmore Fine Art, Inc., New York, NY
- 1999 American Tonalism, Montclair Museum of Art, Montclair, NJ
- 2001 Picturing America: American Art from the Museum's Permanent Collection, Newark Museum of Art, Newark, NJ
- 2001 City as the Source for the Artist, D. Wigmore Fine Art, Inc., New York
- 2002 L'Impressionisme Americain 1880-1915 Fondation de l'Hermitage, Lausanne, Switzerland
- 2002 Artists in Embassies, Bratislavan -US Embassy, Bratislavan, Slovakia
- 2003 After Whistler: The Artist and His Influence on American Painting, High Museum Museum of Art, Atlanta, GA
- 2005 “The Poetic Vision: American Tonalism”, Spanierman Gallery, New York, NY
- 2005 Artists in Embassies, Rome - US Embassy, Rome Italy
- 2012 Modernizing America; Artists of the Armory Show, Heckscher Museum of Art, Huntington, NY
- 2012 Picturing America: Far From the Modern World; The Late Gilded Age, 1900-1920, Newark Museum of Art, Newark, NJ
- 2013 The New Spirit: American Art in the Armory, 1913, Montclair Art Museum
- 2013 The Armory Show at 100, 1913, New York Historical Society, New York, NY
- 2014 The Summer Impressionist, Sullivan Goss, An American Gallery, Santa Barbara
- 2015 An American Century, ACA Galleries, New York
- 2015 The Winter Salon, Sullivan Goss, An American Gallery, Santa Barbara
- 2017 Spring Masters New York, ACA Galleries, New York, NY
- 2017 The Fall Salon, Sullivan Goss, An American Gallery, Santa Barbara
- 2017 An American Century, ACA Galleries, New York, NY
- 2018 The Winter Salon I, Sullivan Goss, An American Gallery, Santa Barbara
- 2018 The Winter Salon II, Sullivan Goss, An American Gallery, Santa Barbara
- 2018 Summer Salon II, Sullivan Goss, An American Gallery, Santa Barbara
- 2018 Ahead in the Clouds, Sullivan Goss, An American Gallery, Santa Barbara
- 2019 A Few of Our Favorite Things, Sullivan Goss, An American Gallery, Santa Barbara
- 2019 The Fall Salon, Sullivan Goss, An American Gallery, Santa Barbara
- 2019 Tonalism: Pathway from the Hudson River School to Modern Art, Samuel Dorsky Museum of Art, New York
- 2019 Mixology, *2019 Tonalism: Pathway from the Hudson River School to Modern Art, Samuel Dorsky Museum of Art, New York
- 2019 Realism To The Edge Of Abstraction, D. Wigmore Fine Art Gallery, New York, NY
- 2019 American Impressionism, Cavalier Galleries, Greenwich, CT
- 2019 Summer Salon, Sullivan Goss, An American Gallery, Santa Barbara
- 2019-2020 The Art of Collecting, Avery Galleries, Bryn Mawr, PA
- 2019 The Winter Show, The Park Avenue Armory, Thomas Colville Fine Art, New York, NY
- 2020 Starry Night: Visions of the Sky, Wildling Museum, Solvang, CA
- 2020 Tonalism: Pathway from the Hudson River School to Modern Art, New York State Museum
- 2020 Expanding Horizons: Celebrating 20 Years of the Hartford Steam Boiler Collection, Florence Griswold Museum, CT
- 2021 The Philadelphia Show, The Philadelphia Museum, Avery Galleries, PA
- 2021 Paper Trail, The Life Story Of Great Works Of Art, Sullivan Goss, An American Gallery, Santa Barbara
- 2023 The Fall Salon, 2023, Sullivan Goss, An American Gallery, Santa Barbara
- 2023 Artist Of The 1913 Armory Show, Graham Shay Gallery, New York, NY

Source: Tessmer, Jeremy (2015). "Leon Dabo". Sullivan Goss.
