= Dabo, Moselle =

Dabo
- Commune
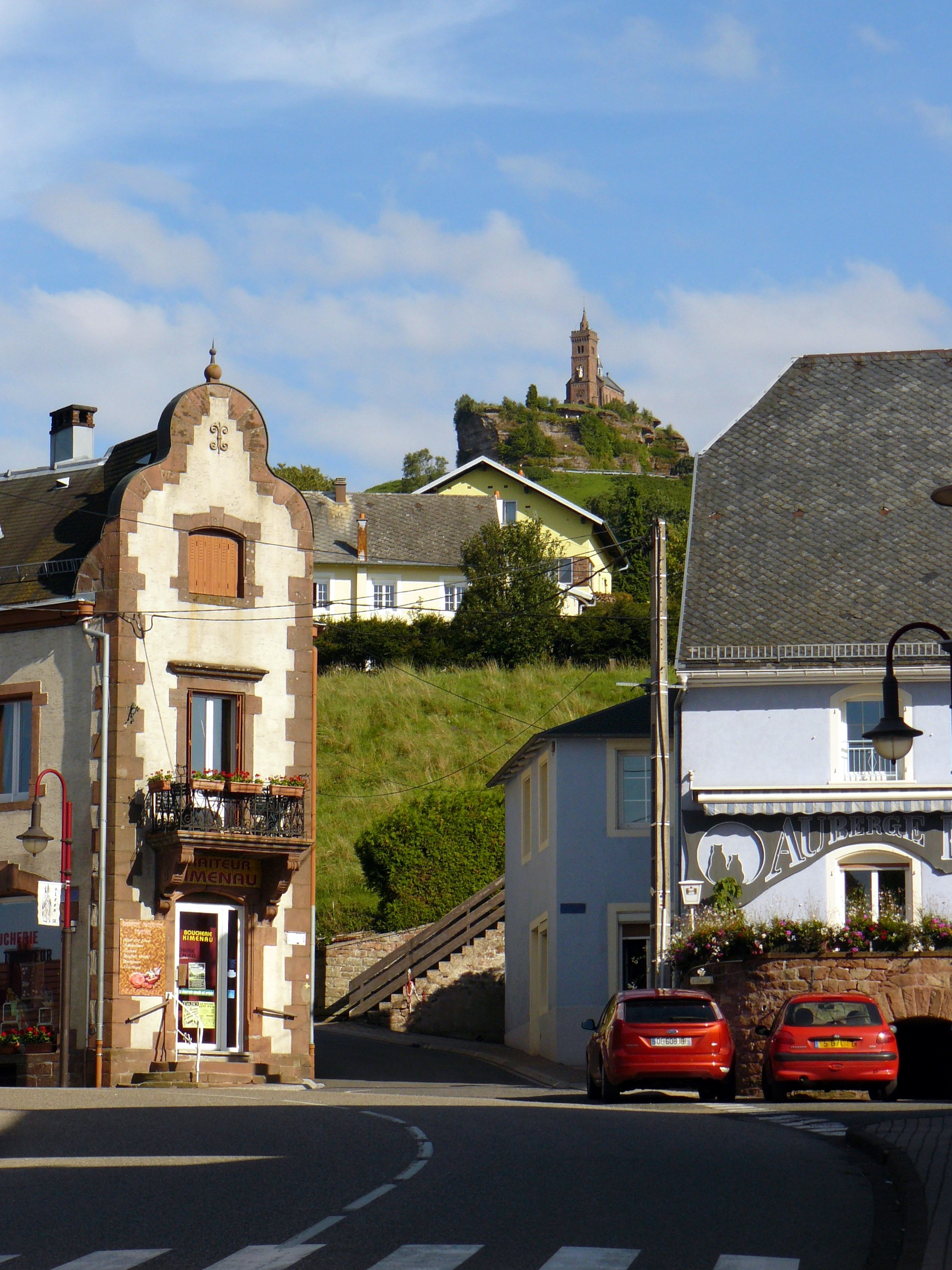
- The rock of Dabo, seen from the village

- Coat of arms
- Location of Dabo
- Location within France Location within Grand Est
- Coordinates: 48°39′15″N 7°14′16″E
- Country: France
- Region: Grand Est
- Department: Moselle
- Arrondissement: Sarrebourg-Château-Salins
- Canton: Phalsbourg
- Intercommunality: Pays de Phalsbourg

Government
  - Mayor (2020–2026): Eric Weber
- Area^{1}: 48.12 km^{2} (18.58 sq mi)
- Elevation: 660 m (2,170 ft)
- Highest elevation: 945 m (3,100 ft)
- Lowest elevation: 236 m (774 ft)
- Population (2023): 2,361
  - Density: 49.06/km^{2} (127.1/sq mi)
- Time zone: UTC+01:00 (CET)
  - Summer (DST): UTC+02:00 (CEST)
- INSEE/Postal code: 57163 /57850
- ^{1} French Land Register data, which excludes lakes, ponds, glaciers > 1 km^{2} (0.386 sq mi or 247 acres) and river estuaries.

Dabo (German: Dagsburg) is a commune in the Moselle department in Grand Est in north-eastern France.

== History ==
Previous names: Dasburch (1188), Dasburg (1189) Dagesburg (1227), Tagesburg (1239), Dagespurg (1313), Dachspurg (1576).
An informal Franco-German summit between President Mitterrand and Chancellor Kohl took place in Dabo July 19, 1983.

== Population ==
Historical population
Year	Pop.	±% p.a.
1968	3,008	—
1975	2,982	−0.12%
1982	2,913	−0.33%
1990	2,789	−0.54%
1999	2,780	−0.04%
2007	2,658	−0.56%
2012	2,639	−0.14%
2017	2,522	−0.90%
2023	2,361	−1.09%
Source: INSEE

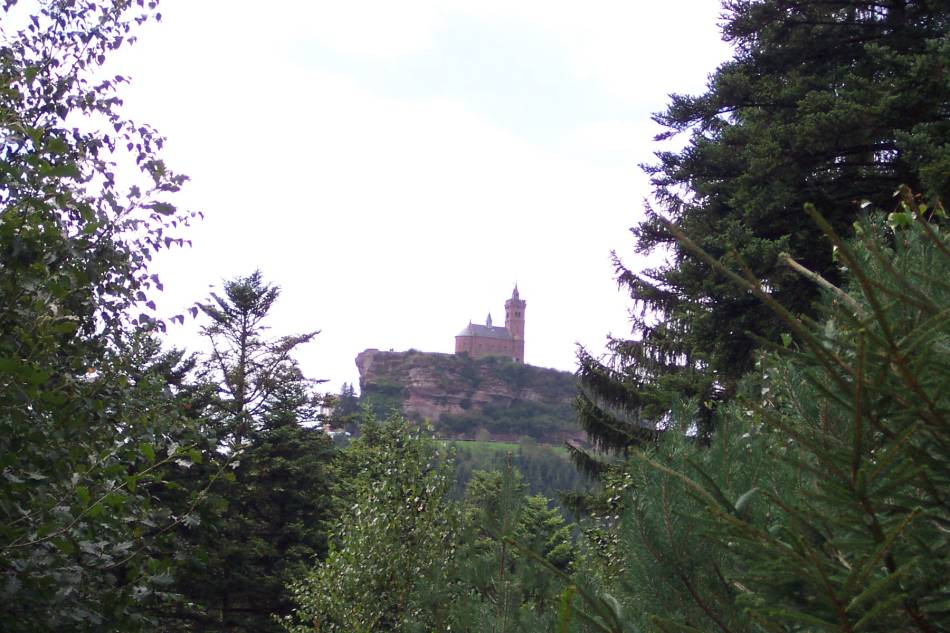
Dabo

== Culture and main sights ==
=== Dabo Rock and Saint-Léon chapel ===
Dabo is mainly known for its rock, named "le Rocher de Dabo", in French. It is a pink sandstone rock crowned by the Saint-Léon chapel. Before the building of this religious site, there was a medieval castle.

This place used to be a celtic worship site. Nowadays, legends are still told about the rock.

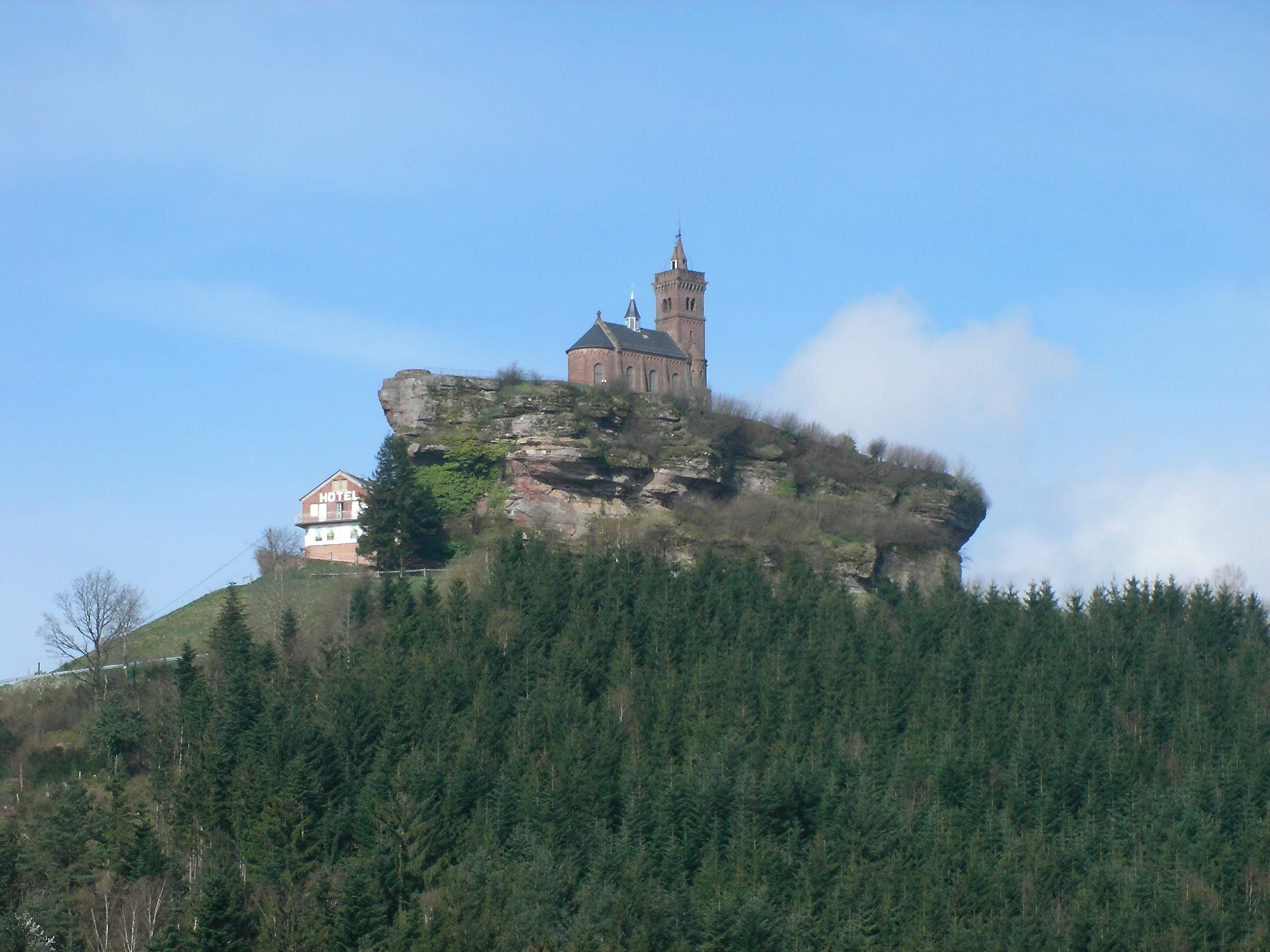
The chapel on top of the rock

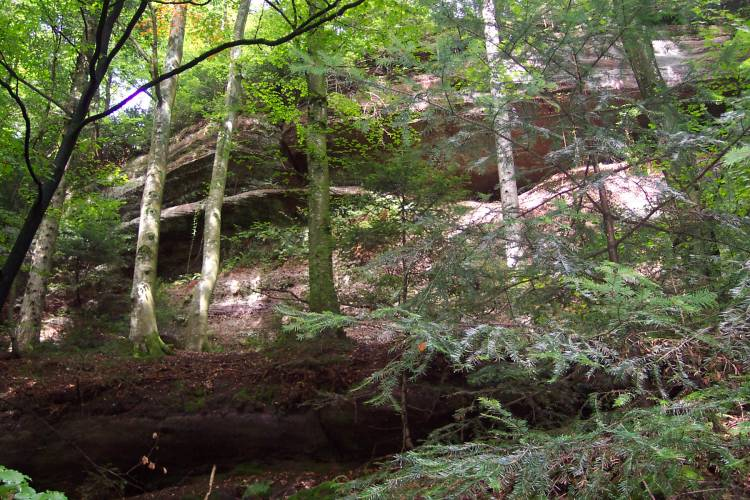
A part of the rock, in the forest

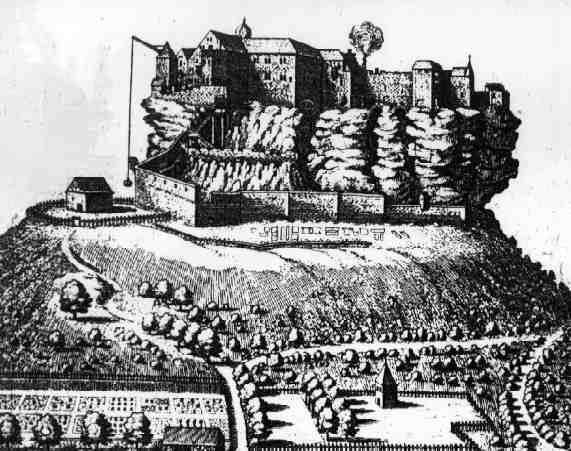
A medieval illustration of the castle

=== The troglodyte houses ===
Two troglodyte houses are still visible today in Dabo. They were inhabited until 1902. Nowadays, tourists and hiking enthusiasts can still visit this place.

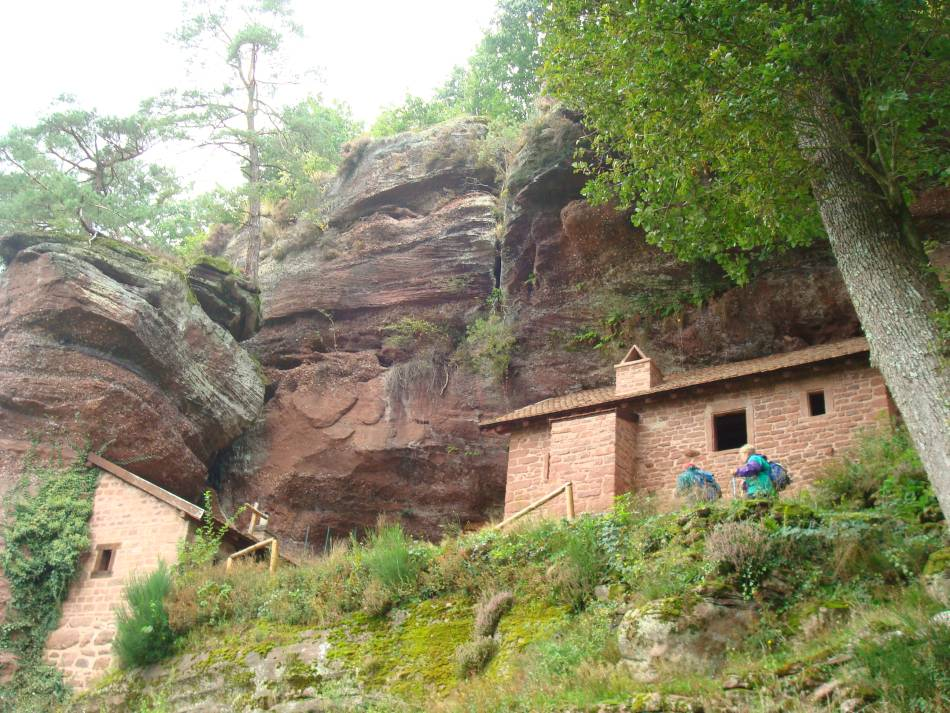

== See also ==
- Communes of the Moselle department
