= National Arts Club =

Literary/artistic club in New York City

The National Arts Club
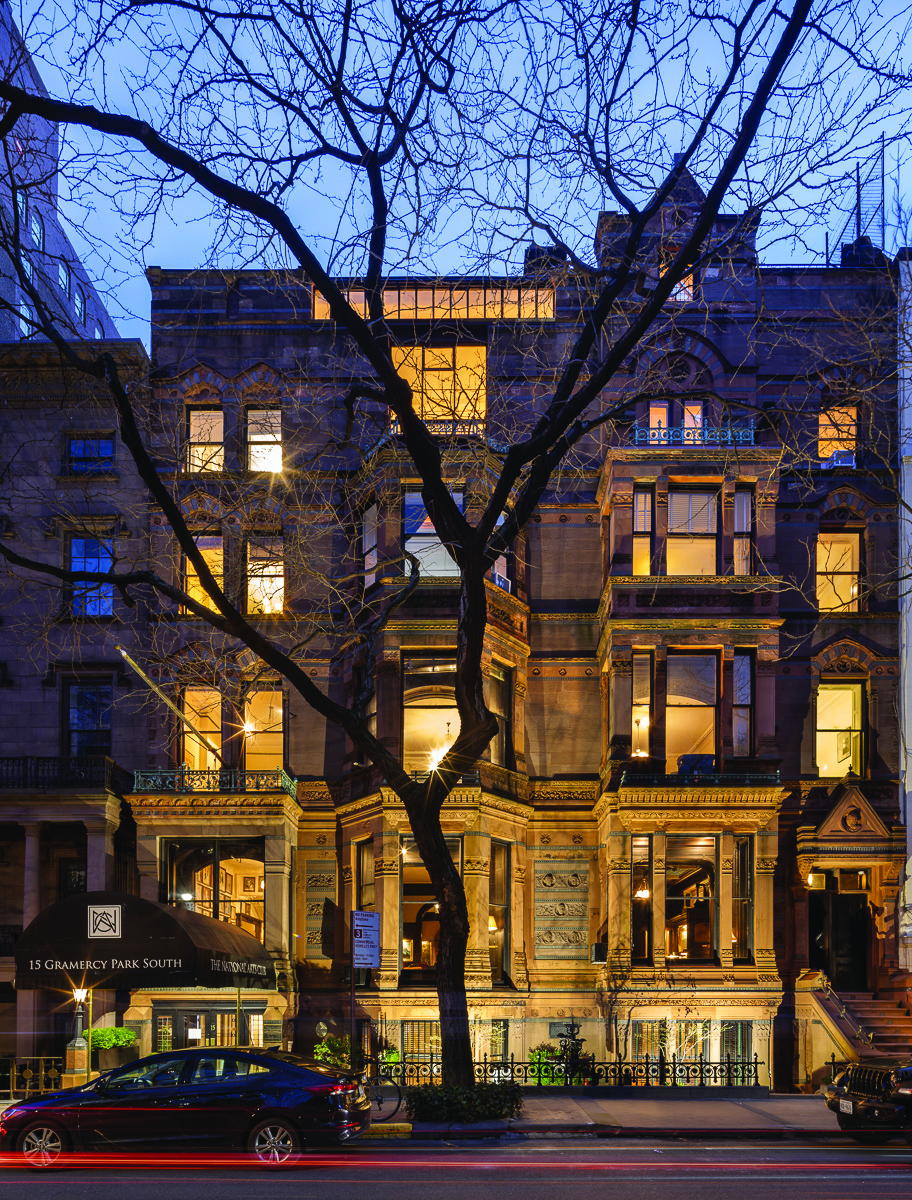
- The club's headquarters at 15 Gramercy Park South, the former Samuel J. Tilden House
- Abbreviation: NAC
- Formation: 1898; 128 years ago
- Type: Nonprofit
- Purpose: Promotion of the arts
- Headquarters: 15 Gramercy Park South, New York, NY
- Coordinates: 40°44′16″N 73°59′12″W
- Region served: United States
- Official language: English
- Affiliations: The National Arts Club
- Website: https://www.nacnyc.org

The National Arts Club is a 501(c)(3) nonprofit and members club at 15 Gramercy Park South in Manhattan, New York City. It was founded in 1898 by Charles DeKay, an art and literary critic of the New York Times, to "stimulate, foster, and promote public interest in the arts and to educate people in the fine arts." The National Arts Club has several art galleries, and hosts a variety of public programs in all artistic areas, including theater, dance, fashion, literature, and music, and more. Although the club is private, all of its programming and exhibitions are free and open to the public.

== History ==
=== Founding ===
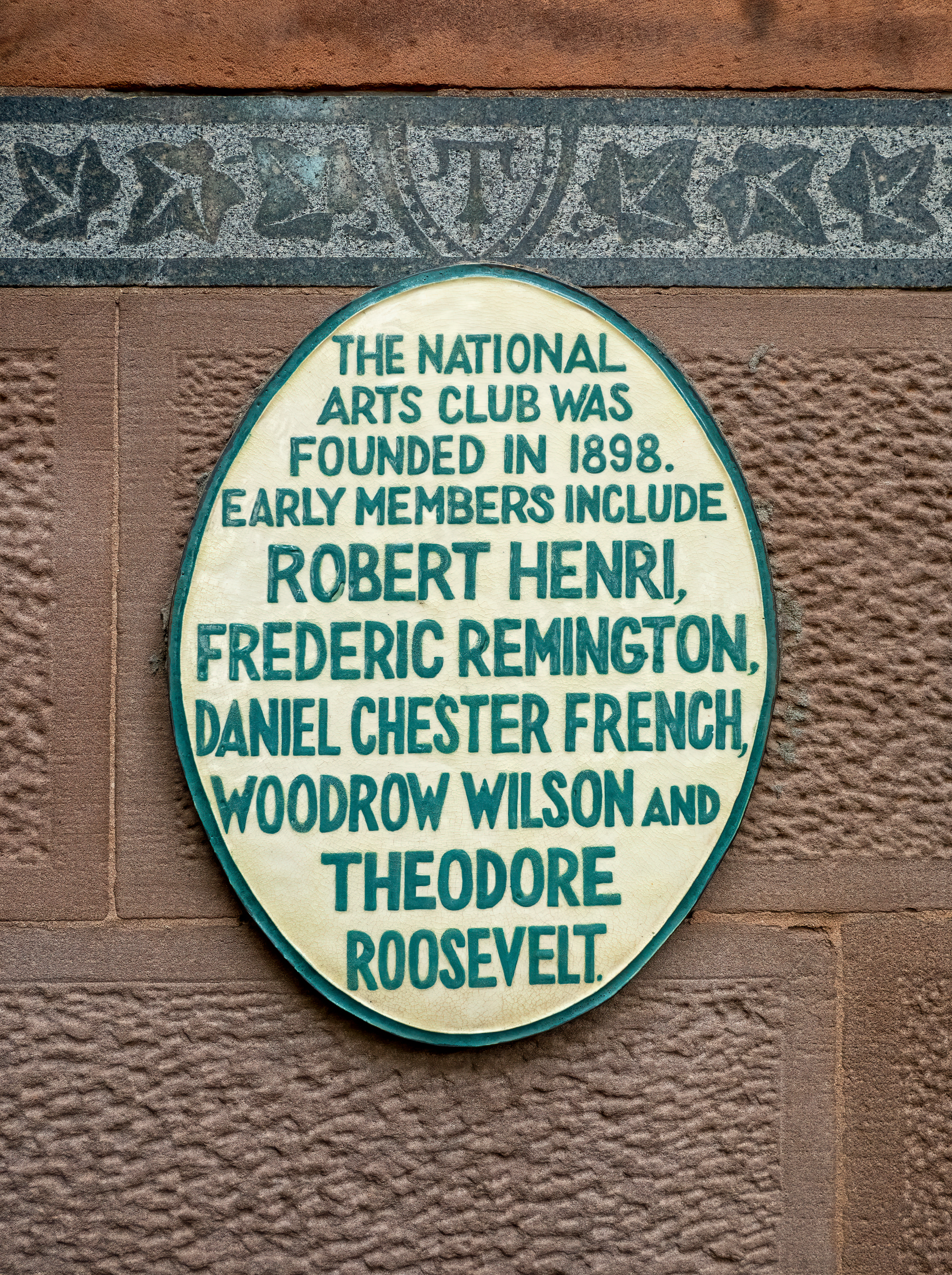
Placard on the exterior of the building.

A group of New York's preeminent artists and patrons, all of them involved in architecture, art, or civic affairs, discussed the possibility of a new kind of club that would embrace all the arts. The establishment of the club came at a time when American artists were increasingly turning to their own nation rather than exclusively to Europe as a center of work and creativity. Significantly, the club would offer full membership for women at the onset, reflecting their accomplishments in the arts.

While the group was working out an organizational plan, Charles DeKay, the literary and art critic of the New York Times for 18 years, returned from a diplomatic post abroad. An inspired organizer and entrepreneur, he sent letters to important men and women in the New York area as well as in metropolitan areas across the country. The response was so enthusiastic that the club was able to apply to Albany for its charter in 1898. With the application went a list of the officers, board of trustees, and members totaling more than 1200.

The list included such collectors as Henry Frick, William T. Evans, Benjamin Altman, Jules Bache and Henry Walters. Though not a charter member, J. Pierpont Morgan joined the club early in its development and was later made an Honorary Vice President. Among the artists of the period, earlier charter members, or those who joined in the early days of the club, were Frederic Remington, William Merritt Chase, Robert Henri, and George Bellows.

The club's first home was a brownstone on West 34th Street. Commerce, meanwhile, was moving up from downtown, and the neighborhood of brownstones was changing.

=== 20th century ===
Because it accepted both men and women, the club was a success and soon required additional space. Walter Leighton Clark, patron and founder of the Grand Central Art Galleries, became a life member in 1907, and was joined by others in his artistic, business and social circles.

Spencer Trask, the club's treasurer, was asked to find the club a new home. He found that 14 and 15 Gramercy Park South, the former home of Samuel Tilden, was on the market. In 1906, the club acquired the Samuel J. Tilden House.

Throughout the 20th century, the club was primarily noted for its exhibits, with a few controversies arising from some of its shows. In 1905, the club displayed a sculpture of Aphrodite that purported to be from ancient Rome. Critics were quick to deride the statue as a fake, placing it as a work that came from a much later era. In 1922, "Nude Girl with a Shawl" (now known as "Nude with White Shawl"), a painting by George Bellows, offended the audience of the time, who considered it immoral.

=== 21st century ===
The early 21st century was marked by financial crisis and a decade-long feud between the club's long-running president and its board that eventually led to the president's expulsion and settlement of state charges against him by the New York State Attorney General's Office.

In 2021, in the midst of the COVID-19 pandemic, the club renovated parts of its building to allow for the opening of new galleries.

== Clubhouse ==
=== Initial clubhouse ===
The initial clubhouse was noted for its tea rooms and the fact that it allowed both men and women to commingle. However, with a growing membership, the club was forced to find a new home. It initially purchased a building next door to the original clubhouse but, in 1906, the club found an opportunity to move into a new space: the Samuel Tilden Mansion.

=== Samuel Tilden House ===
Since 1906 the organization has occupied the Samuel J. Tilden House, a landmarked Victorian Gothic Revival brownstone at 15 Gramercy Park, next door to The Players, a club with similar interests. The Tilden House was designated a New York City landmark in 1966, and declared a National Historic Landmark in 1976. It is located in the Gramercy Park Historic District.

The new clubhouse opened its doors in 1906, with a billiard room and a parlor on the ground floor, and reading rooms and smoking rooms on the 1st floor. The 2nd floor was purely focused on team rooms for female members.

==== Facade ====
During the 2006 restoration of the Tilden mansion's stoop, the Brazilian New York City artist Sergio Rossetti Morosini sculpted a bust of Michelangelo above the front door on the building's façade.

The Bust of Michelangelo, sculpted by Sergio Rossetti Morosini

==== Permanent collection ====
The NAC houses a permanent collection of over 700 works of art, many of which were directly donated by artists in the early 20th century. These pieces, which include paintings, photographs, sculptures, and works on paper, embody the rich history of the NAC's community and exemplify American Impressionism, Tonalism, and contemporary American art.

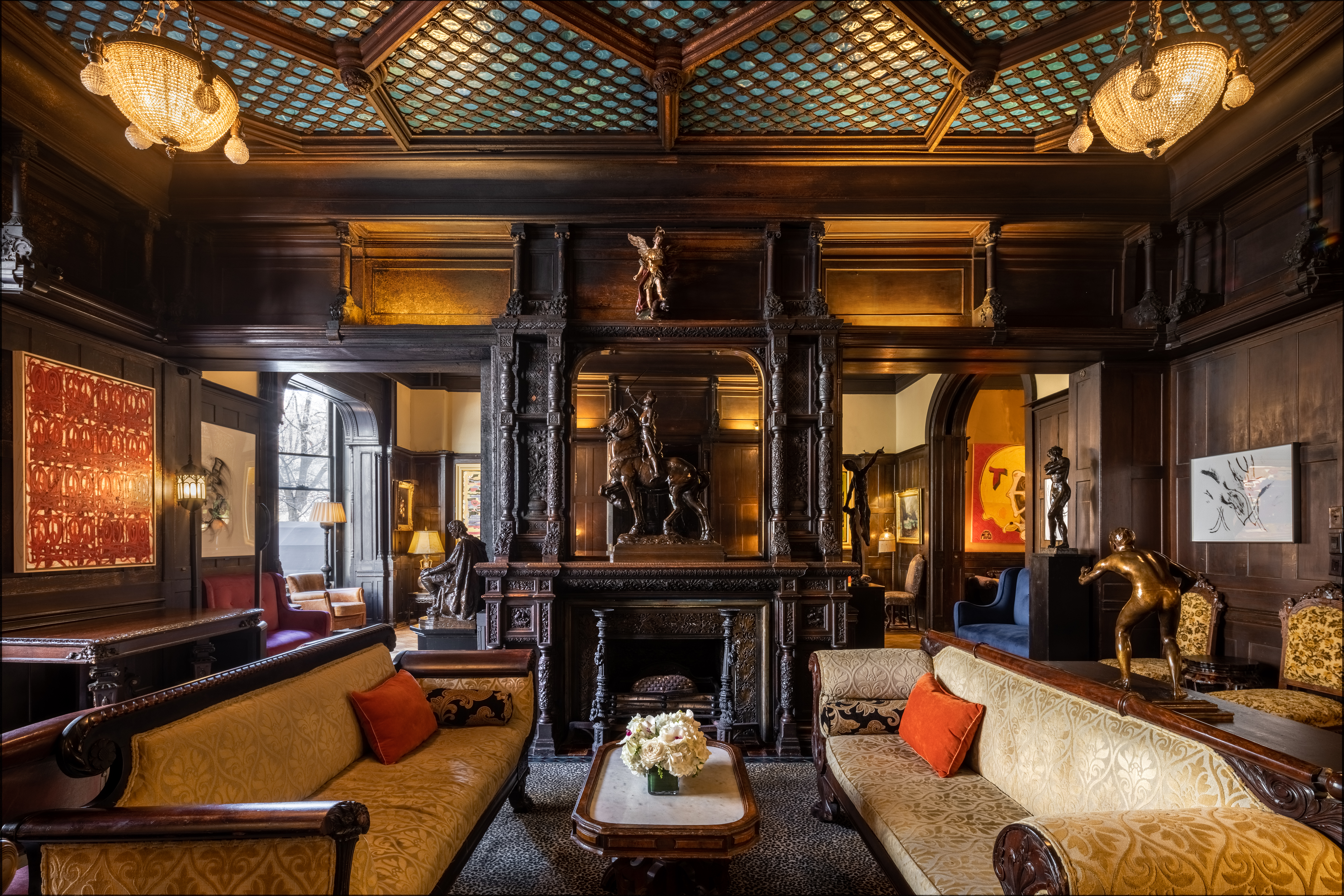
The west parlor

The core of the collection includes classic late 19th - early 20th century landscapes and portraits by Robert Henri, Daniel Garber, Gari Melchers, William McGregor Paxton, Robert Spencer, Philip Leslie Hale, and Charles Hawthorne, among distinguished others. Sculpture is represented by unique pieces by Anna Hyatt Huntington, Malvina Hoffman, Daniel Chester French, Victor Brenner, and Paul Manship.

Major modern and contemporary canvases by Larry Rivers, Will Barnet, Chen Chi, Everett Raymond Kinstler, Greg Wyatt, Kendall Shaw, Lois Dodd, and Carlos Quintana expand the scope of the collection. The collection also features an outstanding collection of works on paper from old masters to moderns including Rembrandt, Goya (a complete seventh edition of Los Caprichos), James Abbott McNeill Whistler, Joseph Fernand Henri Léger, Jane Wilson, Mary Frank, James Rosenquist, Lucas Samaras, and Claes Oldenberg.

In keeping with its goal of supporting research in American art, the club frequently loans works from the collection to scholarly exhibitions presented by institutions and galleries such as the Florence Griswold Museum; the Thomas Walsh Gallery, Fairfield University; the Trout Gallery, Dickinson College; the Society of Illustrators, New York; and Berry-Hill Galleries, New York.

== Public programs ==
=== Events ===
The club produces over 150 free public events per year, allowing the general public to get a broader understanding of the arts, in categories like architecture, archeology, fashion, photography, literary, music, theater, dance, and more.

=== Exhibitions ===
The club hosts a rotating series of public art exhibitions in its galleries. Works by Keith Haring, Ilya and Emilia Kabakov, Joan Miró, Pablo Picasso, Lissa Rivera, Andy Warhol, and many other renowned artists have been featured in the space.

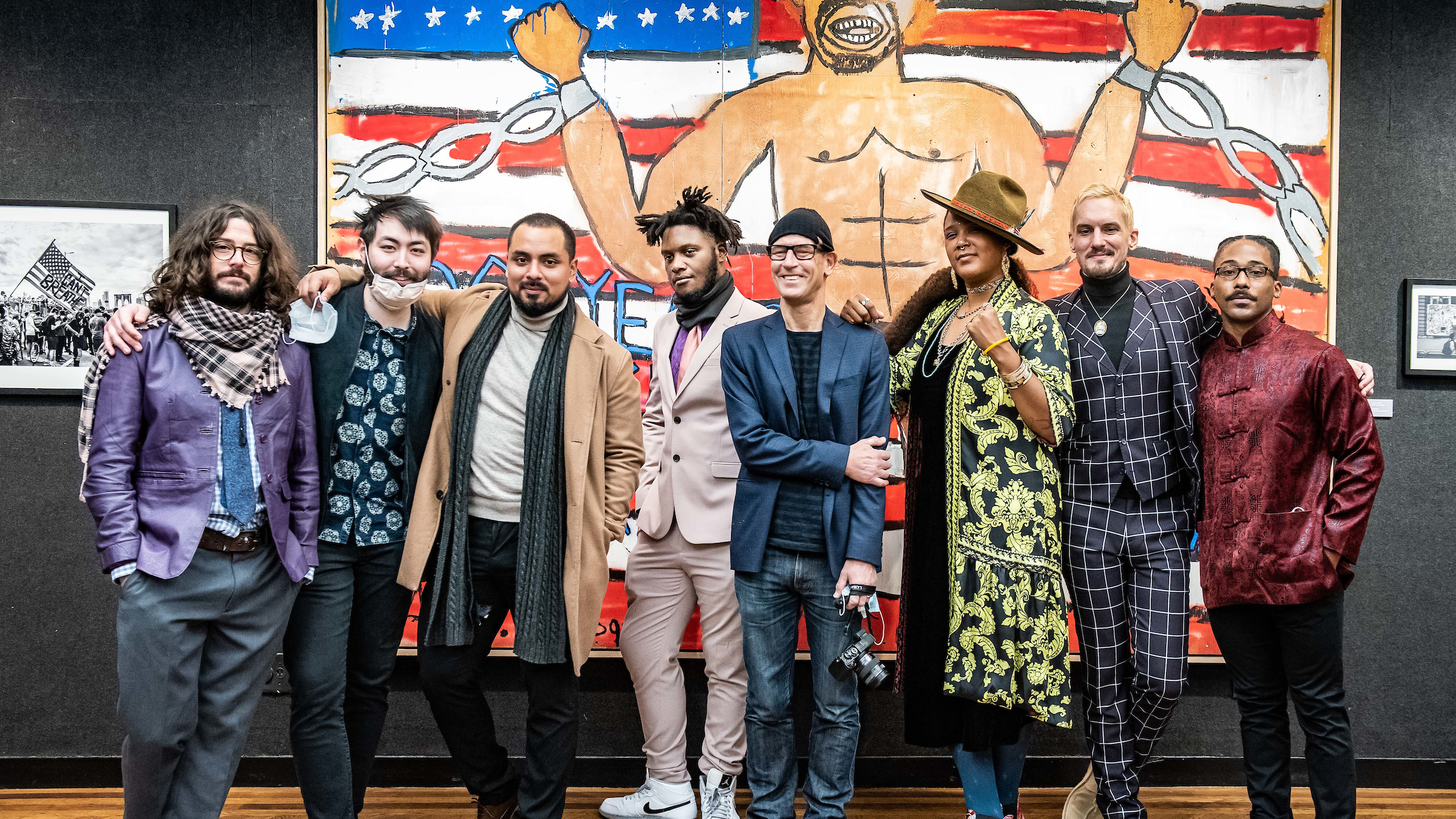
Voices of Soho Participating Artists at The National Arts Club

In December 2020, the Club presented Voices of the Soho Renaissance, the first exhibition of artwork born out of the calls for social justice which transformed New York City's Soho neighborhood, following the murders of George Floyd and Breonna Taylor. The show was followed by What Happened This Summer: ART2HEART, a second exhibition exploring the topic.

=== Other societies within the club ===
Several smaller groups have existed within the National Arts Club:

- The Discus, a short-lived eating and debating club.
- The Vagabonds, a lunch group of writers, editors, printers, and illustrators. They met on Mondays in the grillroom of the club. Members included Leon Dabo, Walter Alden Dyer, Henry James Forman, Alexander Harvey, Forbes Lindsay, Mathias Sandor, Harry Peyton Steger, Ryan Walker, Edward Jewitt Wheeler, Theodore Dreiser, Benjamin De Casseres, Marius de Zayas, and Andrew Carnegie, who "humorously deplored the fact that he was not a vagabond". In 1907, Harvey founded their magazine or pamphlet The Bang, which was published weekly until December 1917.
- The Men's Open Table, 1910–1950s, weekly dinners with a speaker.
- The Women's Open Table

== Membership ==
=== Requirements for membership ===
From its very early days, the club differed from other social clubs. At its founding, the New York Times remarked: "This club differs from the others in several ways, especially in the fact that it has a very serious purpose, namely to encourage the arts side of American manufactures. On its social side, it presents an innovation in club life. It offers equal privileges to women, and has already over a hundred members of the gentler sex."

The club now has about 2,000 members who come from both the art world or are supporters of the arts. Members work in committees to organize events and exhibits that are available for free to the general public.

One of the unusual benefits of membership it that the club allows members access to a Gramercy Park key.

=== Reciprocal clubs ===
The National Arts Club maintains reciprocal agreements with clubs worldwide, allowing members access to facilities when traveling.

Club	City	Country
The Arts Club of Louisville	Louisville, KY	U.S.
The Arts Club of Washington	Washington, DC	U.S.
DACOR Bacon House	Washington, DC	U.S.
The Cliff Dwellers Club	Chicago, IL	U.S.
The Cosmos Club	Washington, DC	U.S.
Grosse Pointe Club	Grosse Pointe Farms, MI	U.S.
The Lenox Club	Lenox, MA	U.S.
Philadelphia Art Alliance	Philadelphia, PA	U.S.
Providence Art Club	Providence, RI	U.S.
St. Botolph Club	Boston, MA	U.S.
The Salmagundi Club	New York, NY	U.S.
The Metropolitan Club	San Francisco, CA	U.S.
Jonathan Club	Los Angeles, CA	U.S.
The Union, University & Schools Club of Sydney	Sydney	Australia
The Arts and Letters Club	Toronto, ON	Canada
Saint James's Club of Montreal	Montreal, QC	Canada
Calgary Petroleum Club	Calgary, AB	Canada
The Arts Club	London	U.K.
The Arts Club	Dubai	UAE
Chelsea Arts Club	London	U.K.
The Century Club	London	U.K.
The Groucho Club	London	U.K.
Sloane Club	London	U.K.
The Travellers Club	London	U.K.
Gleneagles Townhouse	Edinburgh	U.K.
Glasgow Art Club	Glasgow	U.K.
The United Arts Club	Dublin	Ireland
El Círculo del Liceo La Rambla	Barcelona	Spain
Círculo Eça de Queiroz	Lisbon	Portugal
Club Lusitano	Central	Hong Kong
The Pencil Club	Umhlanga	South Africa
National Liberal Club	London	U.K.

== Notable people ==
=== Members ===
The National Arts Club is one of the few private clubs that has admitted women as full and equal members since its inception.

Among the distinguished painters who have been members are Robert Henri, Leon Dabo, Edward Charles Volkert, Frederic Remington, William Merritt Chase, Richard C. Pionk, Chen Chi, Larry Rivers, Louise Upton Brumback, Cecilia Beaux, Will Barnet, Everett Raymond Kinstler, and Michael Cheval. Sculptors have been represented by Augustus Saint-Gaudens, Daniel Chester French, Anna Hyatt Huntington and Paul Manship. Many renowned literary figures, including Robert William Service in 1910, W. H. Auden, Mark Twain and Frank McCourt have been members. The National Arts Club is proud of its early recognition of new media art forms, like photography, film and digital media, and counts Alfred Stieglitz as one of its early members. Musicians Victor Herbert and Walter Damrosch were members, as were architects Stanford White, George B. Post, and Downing Vaux. George B. Post served as the first President of the National Arts Club.

The membership of the National Arts Club has included three Presidents of the United States: Theodore Roosevelt, Woodrow Wilson and Dwight Eisenhower along with Senator William A. Clark.

=== The Medal of Honor ===
Beginning in 1906, the National Arts Club started awarding the prestigious Medal of Honor honoring exemplary leaders in their chosen fields of art.

Recipients of the award include WH Auden, Anthony Burgess, Eudora Welty, Tennessee Williams, Norman Mailer, Saul Bellow, Allen Ginsberg, John Updike, Marguerite Yourcenar, Iris Murdoch, Philip Roth, Salman Rushdie, Arthur Miller, Joseph Campbell, Margaret Atwood, Toni Morrison, Nadine Gordimer, Tom Wolfe, Chinua Achebe, Don DeLillo, Joyce Carol Oates, Martin Amis, Salman Rushdie, John Ashbery, Leonard Bernstein, Alice Tully, Avery Fisher, Amyas Ames and the New York Philharmonic, Frederica von Stade, Benny Goodman, Isaac Stern, James Levine, Plácido Domingo, Itzhak Perlman, Paddy Moloney, Byron Janis, Ilse Bing, Manuel Alvarez Bravo, John Szarkowski, Inge Morath, George Kalinsky, R. Buckminster Fuller, I.M. Pei, Daniel Libeskind, Skidmore, Owings, and Merrill, Robert A. Stern, Eleanor Roosevelt, Salvador Dalí, Chen Chi, Louise Nevelson, Stewart Klonis and The Art Students League, Louise Bourgeois, Robert Rauschenberg, Will Barnet, Christo, Roy Lichtenstein, Dale Chihuly, Chuck Close, James Turrell, James Moody, Ed Ruscha, Spike Lee, Whoopi Goldberg, Richard Dreyfuss, John Turturro, Lynn Redgrave, Olympia Dukakis, Ang Lee, Lin-Manuel Miranda, Claire Bloom, Ellen Burstyn, Patricia Field, Jack O'Brien, Paul Auster, William Ivey Long, Dr. Neil DeGrasse Tyson, and Anna Sui.

=== Kesselring Prize for Playwriting ===
The Kesselring Prize for Playwriting was established at the National Arts Club in 1980 by Charlotte Kesselring, widow of the late American playwright, Joseph Kesselring. As of 2025, the prize includes $25,000 and a two-week residency at the historic clubhouse of The National Arts Club.

Past recipients include Tony Kushner, Anna Deavere Smith, David Lindsay-Abaire, Aleshea Harris, James Ijames, David Auburn, José Rivera, David Adjmi, Doug Wright, Lauren Yee, Rajiv Joseph, Melissa James Gibson, Jo Carson, Nicky Silver, Naomi Wallace, Philip Kan Gotanda, Mona Mansour, Tracey Scott Wilson, and Marion McClinton, among others.

== In popular culture ==
Over the years, the National Arts Club has been used for several prominent film and television productions,. as well as numerous prominent photo shoots, TV interviews, and fashion shows.

=== TV shows ===
- American Horror Stories
- American Masters: Yours for a Song: The Women of Tin Pan Alley
- Billions
- Boardwalk Empire
- Forever
- Gotham
- Gossip Girl
- Law & Order SVU
- The Marvelous Mrs. Maisel
- Pretend It's a City
- Smash
- Z: The Beginning of Everything

=== Movies ===
- The Age of Innocence (1993 film)
- Cradle Will Rock
- Kramer vs. Kramer
- Manhattan Murder Mystery
- Quiz Show
- Rebel in the Rye
- Windows of the World

=== Books ===
Arts shown at the National Arts Club has been the topic of many books, including:

- A Legacy of Art: Paintings and Sculptures by Artist Life Members of the National Arts Club
- A Realist View: Paintings, Drawings and Sculpture By 11 Americans - May 1 Through May 21, 1961 at the National Arts Club
- The National Arts Club Sketchbook
- Aye Simon: A Retrospective
