= List of women artists in the Armory Show =

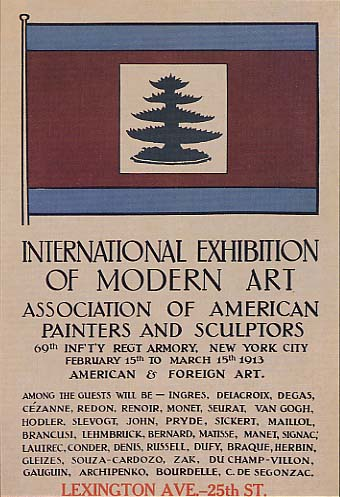
Armory Show poster, 1913

The list of women artists in the Armory Show attempts to include women artists from the United States and Europe who were exhibited in the Armory Show of 1913. The show contained approximately 1300 works by 300 artists. A high proportion of the artists were women, many of whom have since been neglected. The list is largely drawn from the catalog of the 1963 exhibition, 1913 Armory Show 50th Anniversary Exhibition organized by the Munson-Williams-Proctor Arts Institute.

The Armory Show refers to the International Exhibition of Modern Art that was organized by the Association of American Painters and Sculptors and opened in New York City's 69th Regiment Armory, on Lexington Avenue between 25th and 26th Streets, on February 17, 1913, and ran to March 15. It became a legendary watershed date in the history of American art, introducing astonished New Yorkers, accustomed to realistic art, to modern art. The show served as a catalyst for American artists, who became more independent and created their own artistic language.

== The artists ==
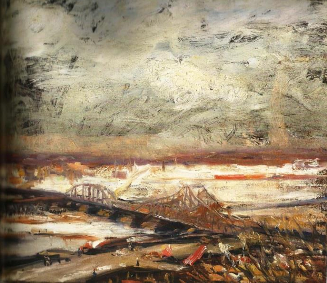
Florence Howell Barkley, Landscape over the City, 1910-1911

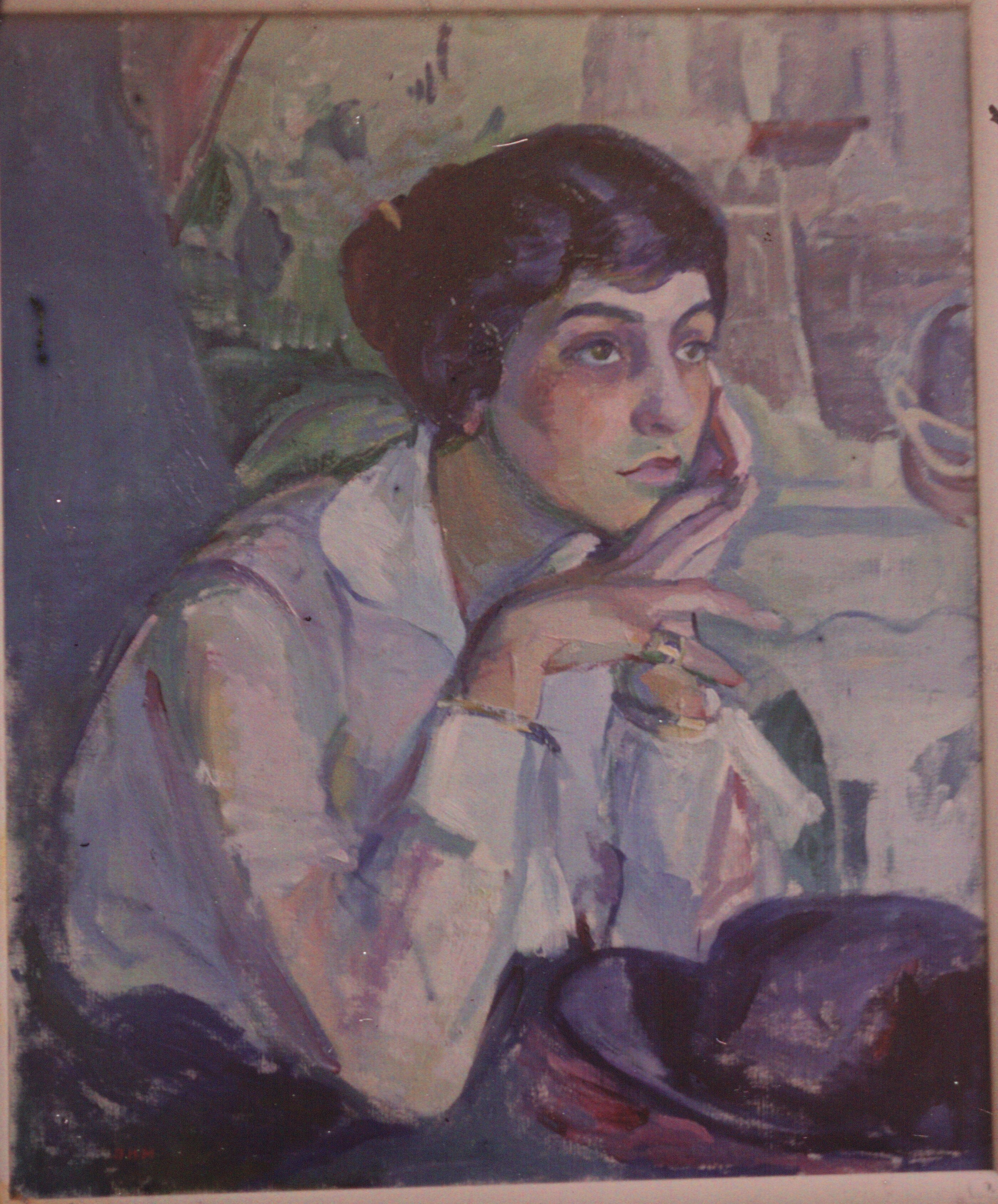
Marion H. Beckett, Portrait of Mrs. Eduard J. Steichen

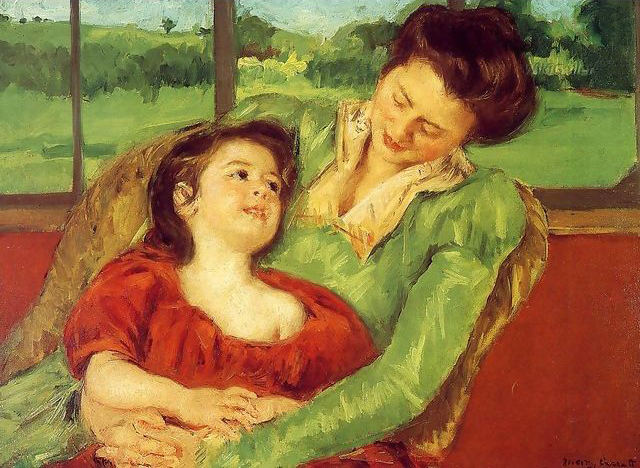
Mary Cassatt, Mère et enfant (Reine Lefebre and Margot before a Window), c.1902

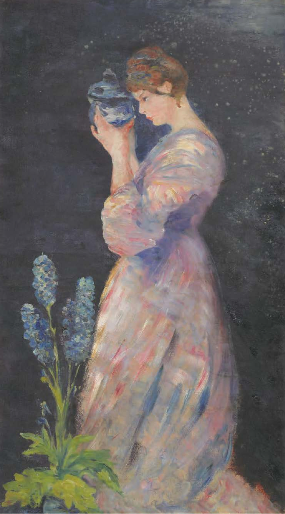
Katherine Sophie Dreier, The Blue Bowl, 1911

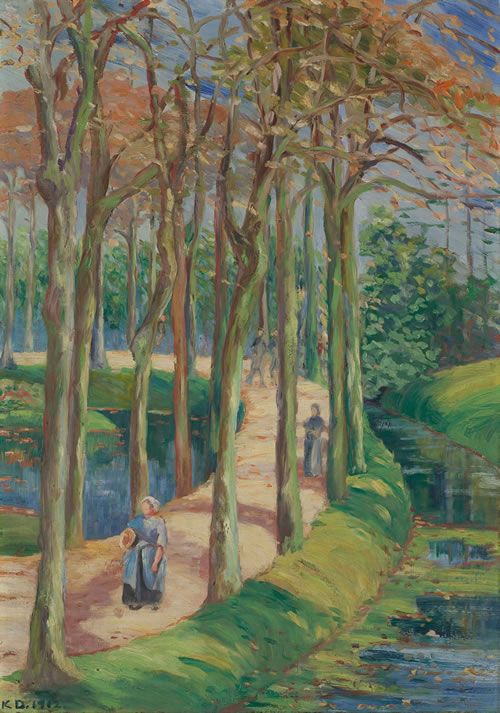
Katherine Sophie Dreier, Landscape with Figures in Woods or The Avenue, Holland, ca. 1911–12. Oil on canvas, 27 ¼ x 19 in. George Walter Vincent Smith Art Museum, Springfield, Massachusetts, Gift from the Artist's Estate.

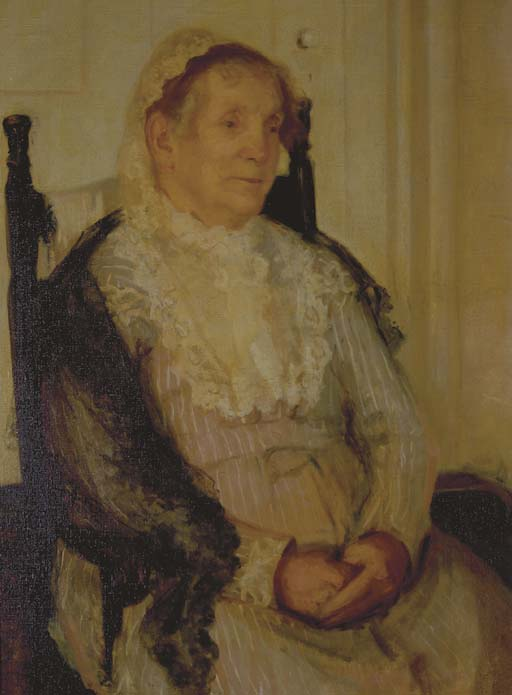
Mary Foote, Old Lady

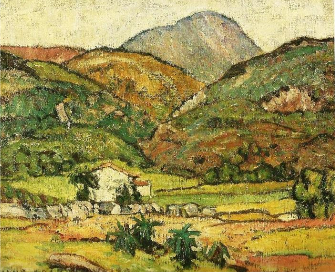
Anne Goldthwaite, The Church on the Hill, ca. 1910-1911

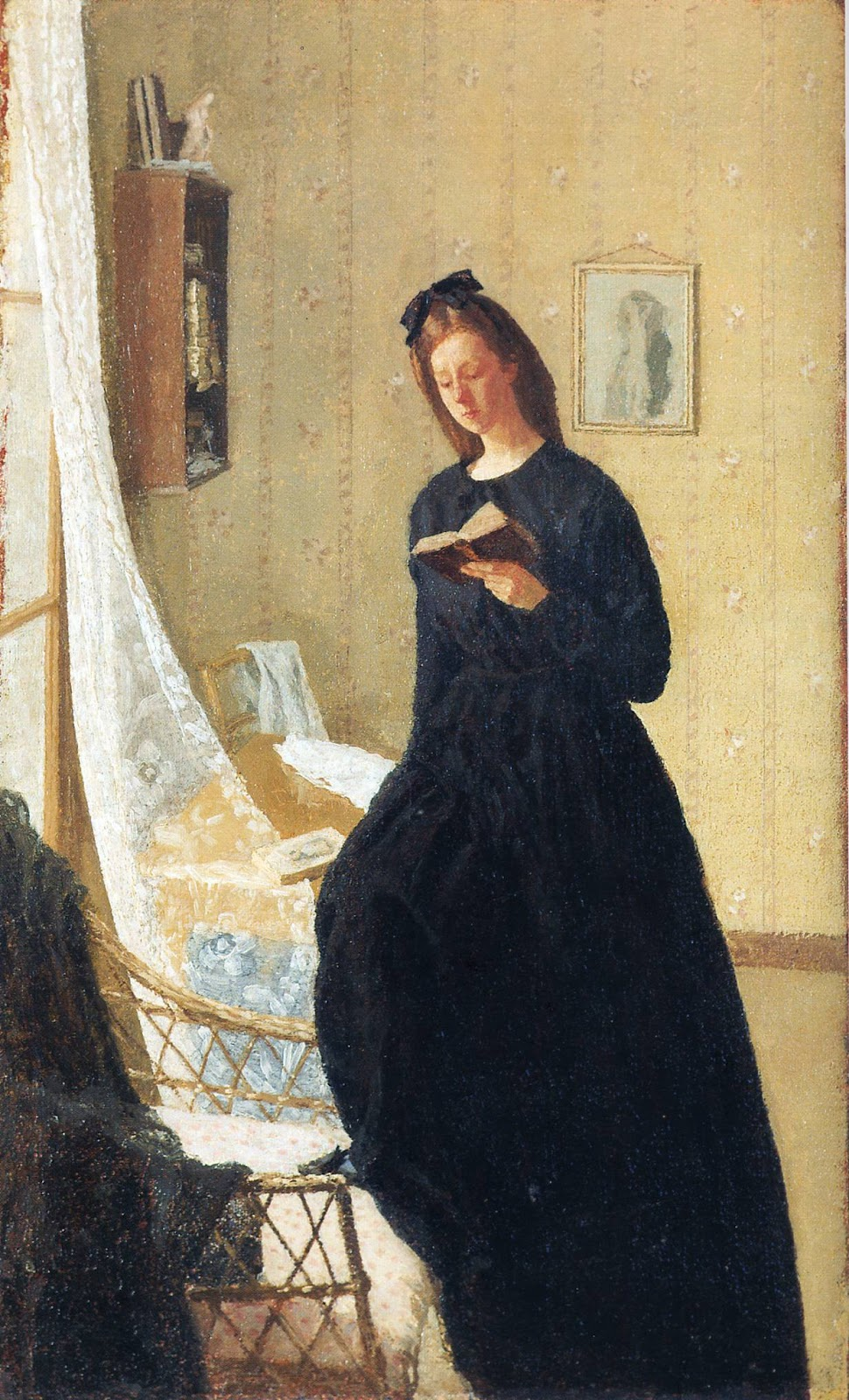
Gwen John, Girl Reading at the Window

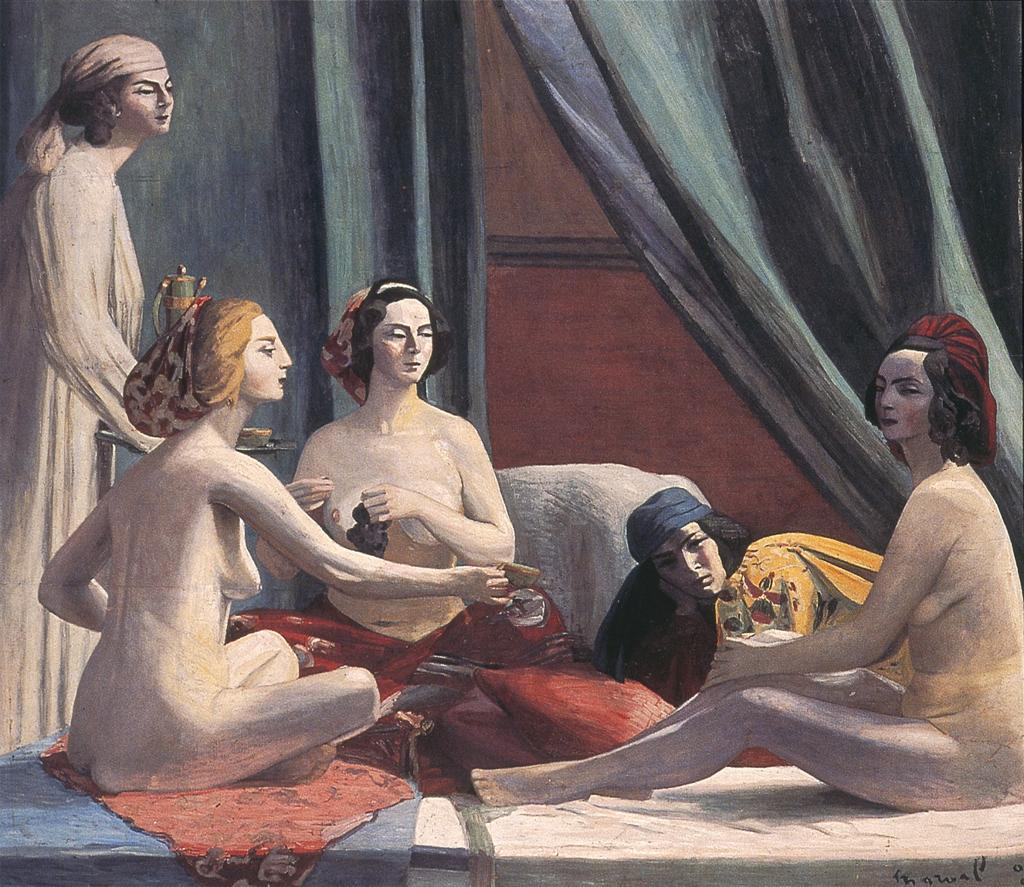
Jacqueline Marval, The Odalisques

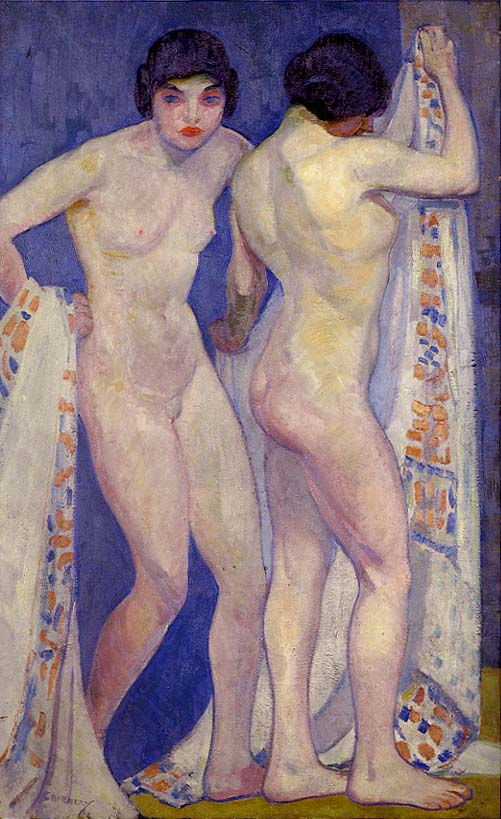
Kathleen McEnery, Going to the Bath

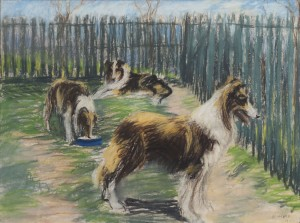
Hilda Ward, The Kennels, pastel, 1910

The following artists are all listed in the 50th anniversary catalog as having exhibited in the 1913 Armory show. Artists are also listed in The Story of the Armory Show. Of the fifty women listed, thirty were initially invited to participate. Twenty more women, who submitted works to a review committee, were also included. Many are discussed in detail in Women of the 1913 Armory Show: Their Contributions to the Development of American Modern Art (2014).

- Florence Howell Barkley
- Marion H. Beckett
- Bessie Marsh Brewer
- Fannie Miller Brown
- Edith Woodman Burroughs
- Mary Cassatt
- Émilie Charmy
- Nessa Cohen
- Kate Cory
- Edith Dimock (Mrs. William Glackens)
- Katherine S. Dreier
- Aileen King Dresser
- Florence Dreyfous
- Abastenia St. Leger Eberle
- Florence Esté
- Lily Everett
- Mary Foote
- Anne Goldthwaite
- Edith Haworth
- Margaret Hoard
- Margaret Wendell Huntington
- Gwen John
- Grace Mott Johnson
- Edith L. King
- Hermine E. Kleinert
- Marie Laurencin
- Amy Londoner
- Jacqueline Marval
- Carolyn Mase
- Kathleen McEnery
- Charlotte Meltzer
- Myra Musselmann-Carr
- Ethel Myers
- Helen J. Niles
- Olga Oppenheimer
- Marjorie Organ (Mrs. Robert Henri)
- Josephine Paddock
- Agnes Lawrence Pelton
- Harriet Sophia Phillips
- Louise Pope
- May Wilson Preston
- Katharine Rhoades
- Mary Rogers
- Frances Simpson Stevens
- Bessie Potter Vonnoh
- Hilda Ward
- Enid Yandell
- Marguerite Zorach

== The artworks ==
The following list of artworks in the Armory Show is compiled from "The Armory Show at 100" from the New York Historical Society and from various catalogs describing the show.

- Florence Howell Barkley (1880/81–1954)
  - Landscape over the City, now titled Jerome Avenue Bridge, 1910–11, oil, Museum of the City of New York
- Marion H. Beckett (1886–1949)
  - Portrait of Mrs. Charles H. Beckett, oil
  - Portrait of Mrs. Eduard J. Steichen, oil
- Bessie Marsh Brewer (1884–1952)
  - The Furnished Room
  - Curiosity
  - Putting Her Monday Name on Her Letterbox
- Fannie Miller Brown (Fannie Wilcox Brown?, b. 1882)
  - Embroidery
- Edith Woodman Burroughs (Edith Woodman; Mrs. Bryson Burroughs) (1871–1916)
  - Bust, now titled Portrait of John Bigelow, ca. 1910, bronze, Museum of Art, Rhode Island School of Design, Providence
- Mary Cassatt (1844–1926)
  - Mère et enfant, 1903, oil
  - Mère et enfant, watercolor, John Quinn
- Émilie Charmy (1878–1974)
  - Roses, oil
  - Paysage, now titled L’Estaque, ca. 1910, oil, Art Institute of Chicago
  - Soir, oil
  - Ajaccio, oil
- Nessa Cohen (1885–1976)
  - Age, plaster
  - Portrait, plaster, Kuhn catalogue: $200; MacRae catalogue: $300; possibly destroyed
  - Sunrise, bronze
- Kate Cory (1861–1968)
  - Arizona Desert, oil
- Edith Dimock (Mrs. William Glackens) (1876–1955)
  - Sweat Shop Girls in the Country, ca. 1913, watercolor, Bernard Goldberg Fine Arts, LLC
  - Mother and Daughter, ca. 1913, watercolor, Bernard Goldberg Fine Arts, LLC
  - Group, now titled Fine Fruits, watercolor, Bernard Goldberg Fine Arts, LLC
  - Group, now titled Three Women, watercolor, Bernard Goldberg Fine Arts, LLC
  - Group, now titled Florist, watercolor, Bernard Goldberg Fine Arts, LLC
  - Group, now titled Bridal Shop, watercolor, Bernard Goldberg Fine Arts, LLC
  - Group, watercolor
  - Group, watercolor
  - Drawings
- Katherine Sophie Dreier (1877–1952)
  - Blue Bowl, oil, Yale University Art Gallery, New Haven, Connecticut
  - The Avenue, Holland, oil, George Walter Vincent Smith Art Museum, Springfield, Massachusetts
- Aileen King Dresser (1889–1955)
  - Quai de la Tournelle, Paris, oil
  - Madame DuBois, oil
  - Notre Dame, Spring, oil
- Florence Dreyfous (1868–1950)
  - A Boy, watercolor
  - Mildred, watercolor
- Abastenia St. Leger Eberle(1878–1942)
  - Group, Coney Island, sculpture, Corcoran Gallery of Art, Washington, D.C.
  - White Slave, 1913, bronze, Gloria and Larry Silver, Connecticut
- Florence Esté (1860–1926)
  - The Village, watercolor, Kuhn catalogue, MacRae catalogue
  - The First Snow, watercolor, Kuhn catalogue, MacRae catalogue
- Lily Abbott Everett (b. 1889)
  - Sunset on the Cottonfields, oil
- Mary Foote (1872–1968)
  - Portrait, now titled Old Lady, oil, sold to the Friends of American Art in Chicago
- Anne Goldthwaite (1875–1944)
  - The Church on the Hill, now titled The House on the Hill, ca. 1911, oil, Blount Corporate Art Collection, Blount International
  - Prince’s Feathers, oil
- Edith Haworth (1878–1953)
  - The Birthday Party, oil
  - The Village Band, oil
- Margaret Hoard (1879–1944)
  - Study of an Old Lady, plaster
- Margaret Wendell Huntington (1867–1958)
  - Cliffs Newquay, oil
- Gwen John (1876–1939)
  - Girl Reading at the Window, 1911, oil, The Museum of Modern Art, New York
  - A Woman in a Red Shawl, 1912, oil
- Grace Mott Johnson (1882–1967)
  - Chimpanzee, bronze, private collection, New York
  - Chimpanzees, bronze, Woodstock Art Association Museum, New York
  - Greyhound Pup, No. 2, bronze
  - Relief (goat), plaster
- Edith L. King (1884–1975)
  - Statue at Ravello, watercolor
  - Bathing Hours, Capri, watercolor
  - The Bathers, Capri, watercolor
  - The Piccola Marina, Capri, watercolor
  - The Marina Grande, watercolor
- Hermine E. Kleinert (1880–1943)
  - Portrait Study, oil
- Marie Laurencin (1885–1956)
  - Portrait, watercolor
  - Desdemona, watercolor
  - Jeune Fille avec éventail, drawing
  - Jeune Fille, drawing
  - La Toilette des jeunes filles, oil
  - La Poétesse, oil
  - Nature morte, oil
- Amy Londoner (1878–1953)
  - The Beach Crowd, pastel
  - Playing Ball on the Beach, pastel
  - The Beach Umbrellas, pastel
  - The Life Guards, pastel
- Jacqueline Marval (1866–1932)
  - Odalisques au miroir, oil, private collection, France
- Carolyn Mase (1880–1949)
  - September Haze, pastel
- Kathleen McEnery (1885–1971)
  - Going to the Bath, 1912, oil, Smithsonian American Art Museum, Washington, D.C.
  - Dream, 1912, oil
- Charlotte Meltzer
  - Hunters, oil
  - Loverene, oil
- Myra Musselmann-Carr (b. 1871)
  - Electra, statuette, bronze
  - Indian Grinding Corn, statuette, bronze
  - Old Woman, substituted in the Kuhn catalogue
- Ethel Myers (1881–1960)
  - The Matron, elsewhere called The Fat Woman, 1912, plaster
  - Fifth Avenue Gossips, plaster
  - Fifth Avenue Girl, 1912, sculpture, Mrs. Albert Lewisohn, private collection
  - Girl from Madison Avenue, 1912, plaster
  - Portrait Impression of Mrs. D. M., 1913, bronze, Nan and David Skier
  - The Window, plaster
  - The Gambler, 1912, plaster, Barry Edward Downes, New York
  - Upper Corridor, plaster
  - The Duchess, plaster
- Helen J. Niles
  - Phyllis, oil
- Olga Oppenheimer (1886–1941)
  - Woodcuts, Nos. 1–6, 1911 (illustrations for Van Zantens glückliche Zeit by Laurids Bruun)
- Marjorie Organ (Mrs. Robert Henri) (1886–1931)
  - Drawings, Nos. 1–6
- Josephine Paddock (1885–1964)
  - Swan on the Grass, 1910, watercolor
  - Swan Study - Peace, 1910, watercolor
  - Swan Study - Aspiration, 1910, watercolor
- Agnes Lawrence Pelton (1881–1961)
  - Vine Wood, ca. 1910, oil, Alec Esker, Yuma, Arizona
  - Stone Age, oil
- Harriet Sophia Phillips (1849–1928)
  - Head, oil
- Louise Pope, Mrs. Henri Hourtal
  - Portrait of Mrs. P., oil
- May Wilson Preston (1873–1949)
  - Girl with Print, oil
- Katharine Rhoades Catherine N. Rhoades (1895–ca. 1938)
  - Talloires, oil
- Mary Rogers Mary C. Rogers (1881–1920)
  - Portrait, 1911, oil
- Frances Simpson Stevens (1894–1976)
  - Roof Tops of Madrid, oil
- Bessie Potter Vonnoh (1872–1955)
  - Dancing Figure, bronze
  - Nude, terracotta
  - Study, terracotta
- Hilda Ward (1878–1950)
  - The Hound, 1910, pastel
  - The Kennels, 1910, drawing, Francis M. Naumann and Marie T. Keller, Yorktown Heights, New York
- Enid Yandell (1870–1934)
  - The Five Senses, bronze
  - Indian and Fisher
- Marguerite Zorach (1888–1968)
  - Study, oil
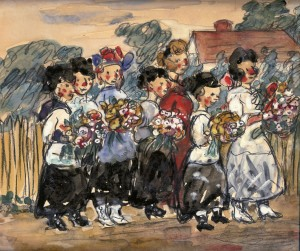
Edith Dimock, Sweat Shop Girls in the Country, ca. 1913, watercolor, gouache, and charcoal on paper

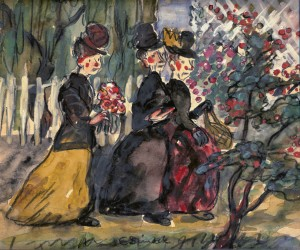
Edith Dimock, Three Women, ca. 1913, watercolor, gouache, and charcoal on paper

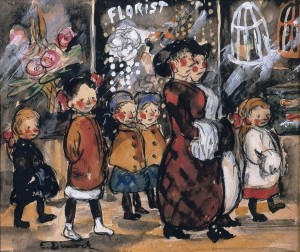
Edith Dimock, Florist, ca. 1913, watercolor, gouache, and charcoal on paper

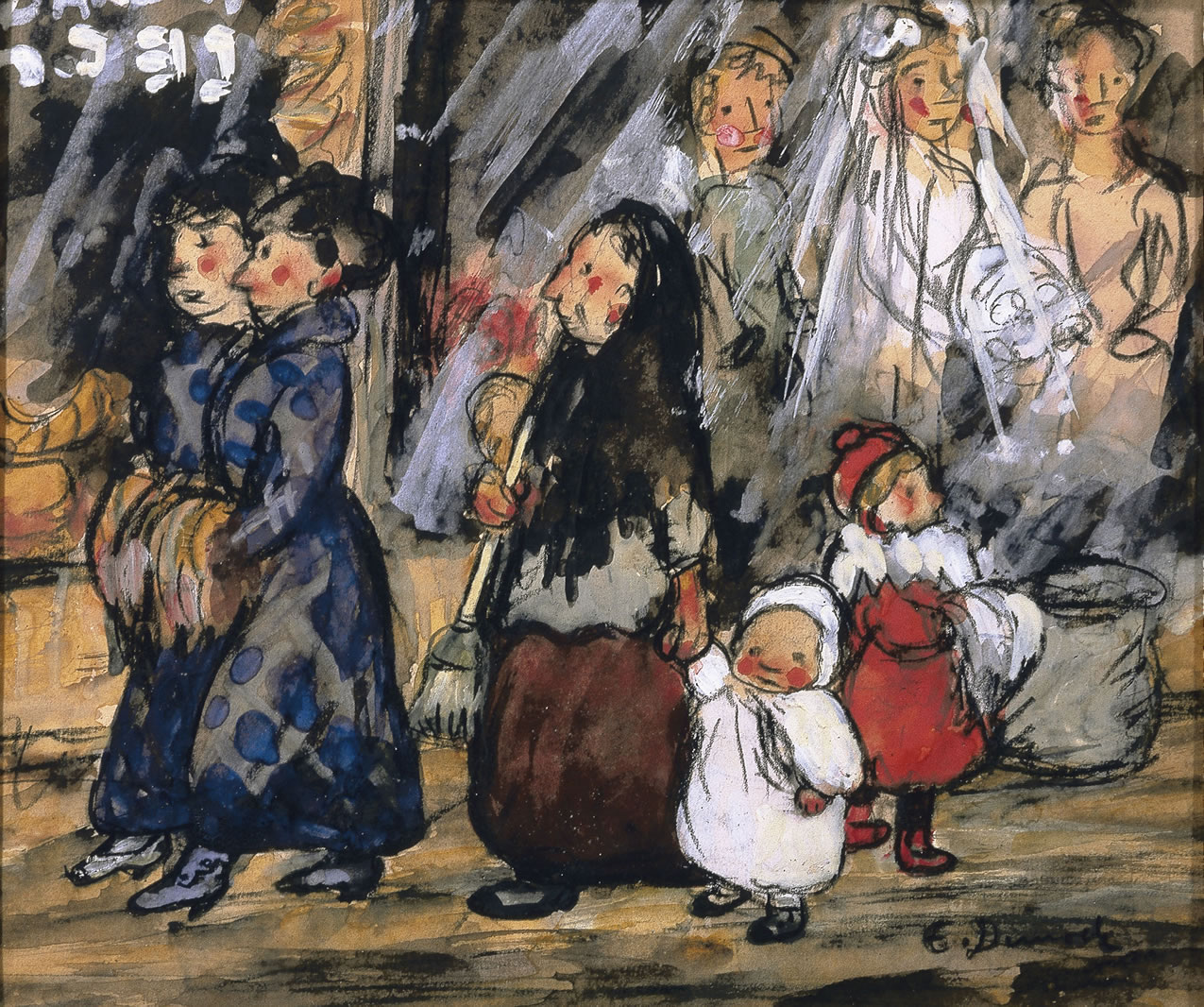
Edith Dimock, Bridal Shop, ca. 1913, watercolor, gouache, and charcoal on paper

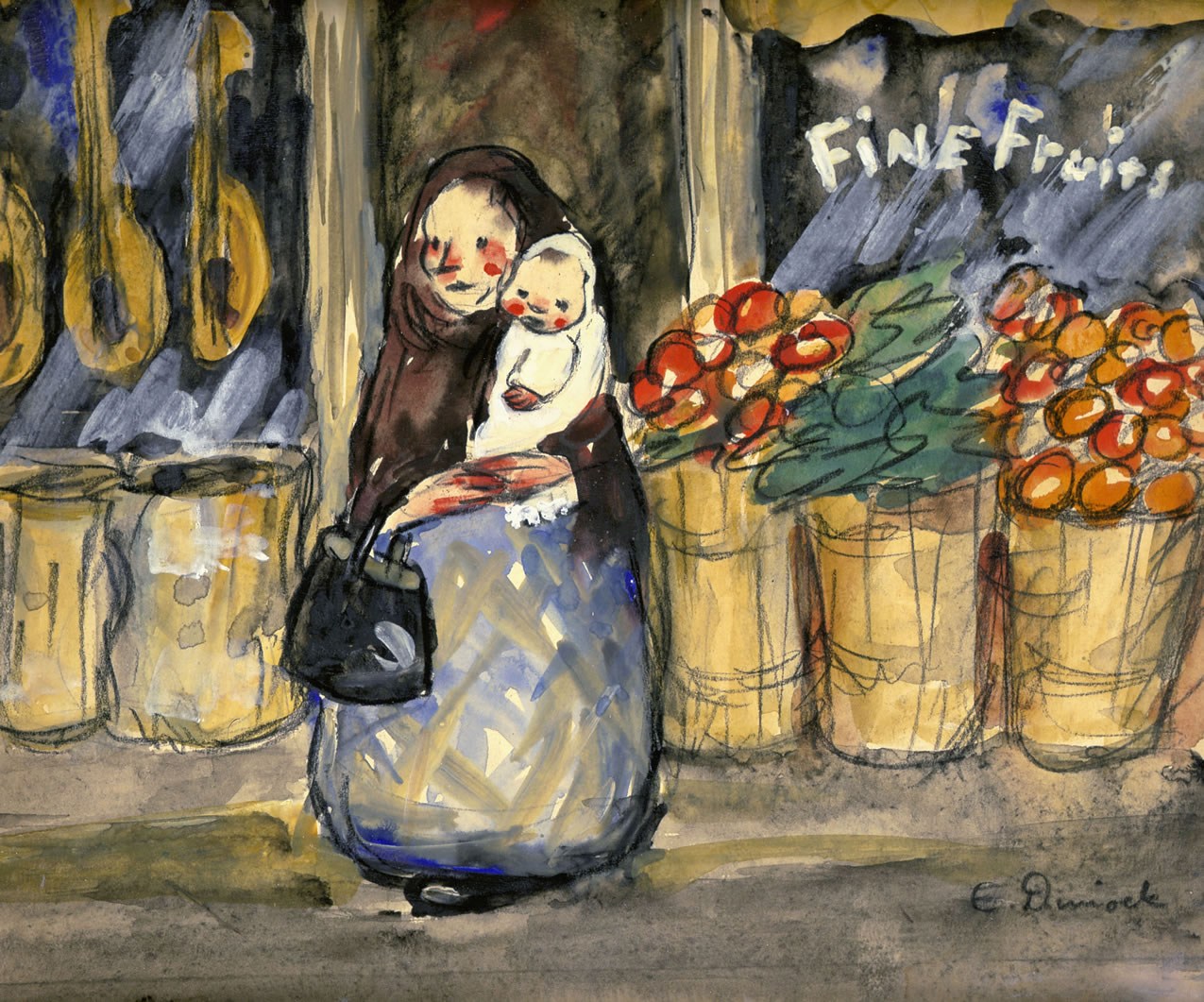
Edith Dimock, Fine Fruits, ca. 1913, watercolor, gouache, and charcoal on paper

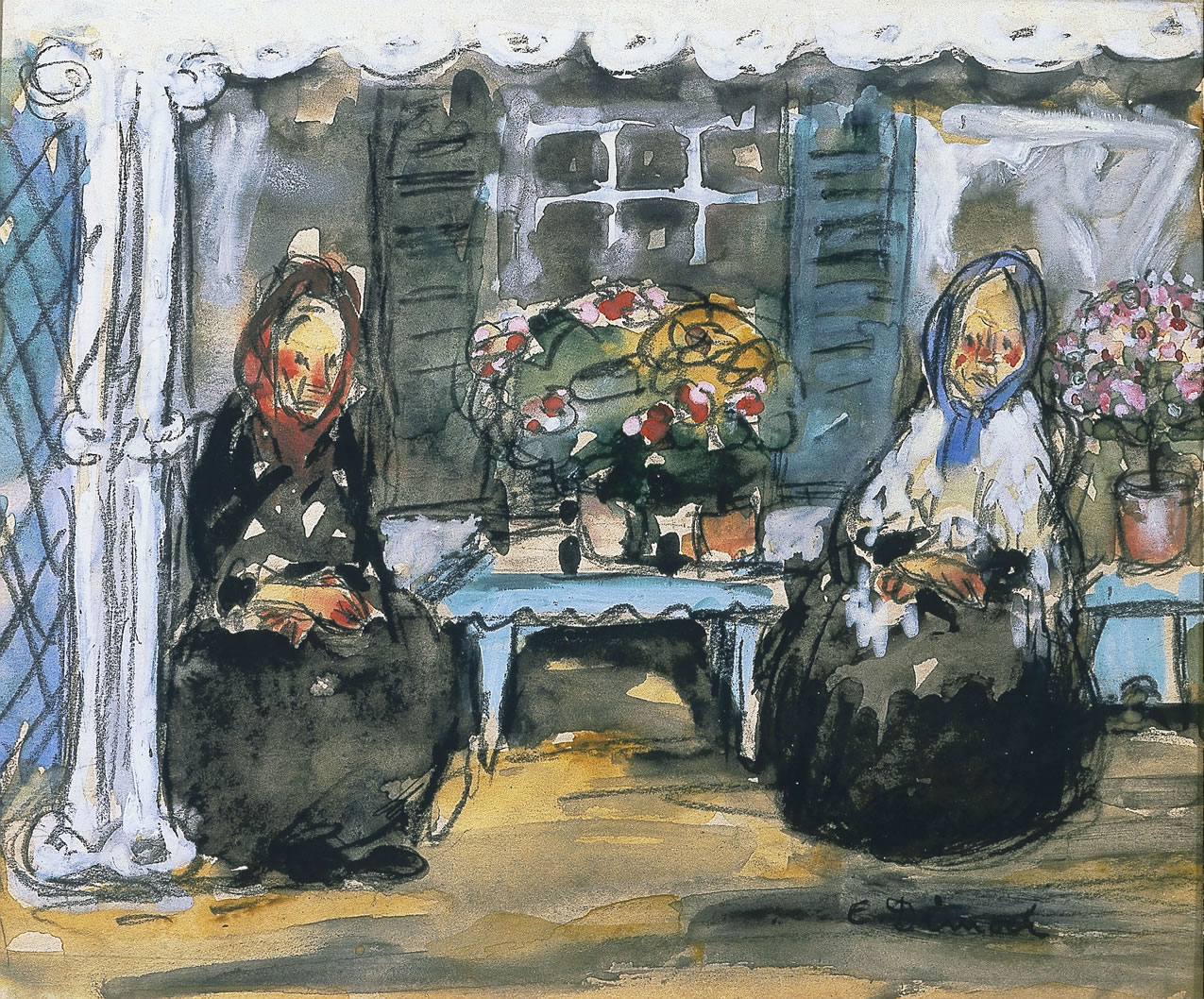
Edith Dimock, Mother and Daughter, ca. 1913, watercolor, gouache, and charcoal on paper

== Black and white reproductions ==
The following are works which appeared in the Armory Show, for which color images are not available. They can be useful in identifying the works that were shown.

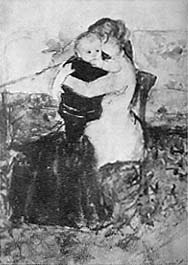
Mary Cassatt, Mère et enfant, 1890

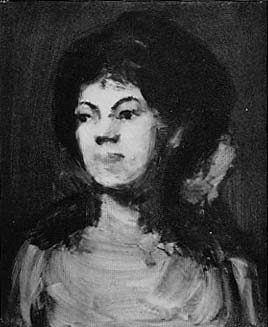
Florence Dreyfous, Mildred, ca. 1910–1913

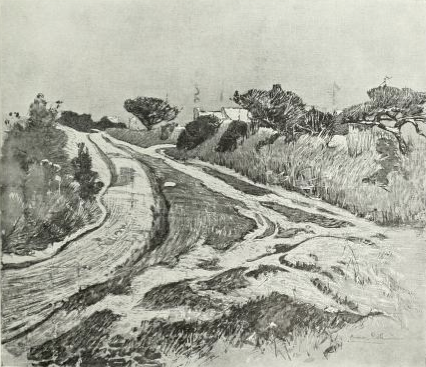
Florence Esté, The First Snow, watercolor, ca. 1909

Marie Laurencin, La Toilette des jeunes filles (Die Jungen Damen), 1911

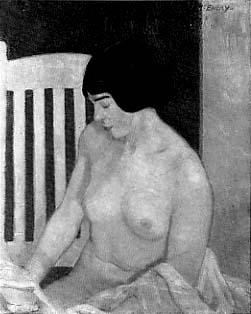
Kathleen McEnery, Dream, 1912

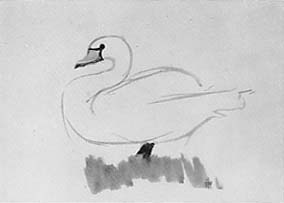
Josephine Paddock, Swan on the Grass, 1910

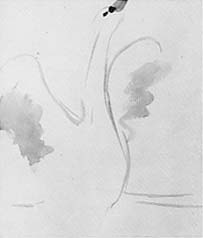
Josephine Paddock, Swan Study - Aspiration, 1910

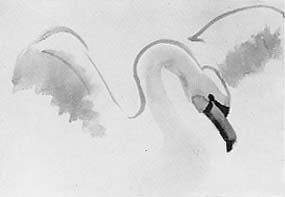
Josephine Paddock, Swan Study - Peace, 1910

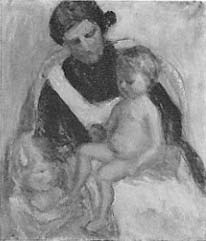
Mary C. Rogers, Portrait, 1911

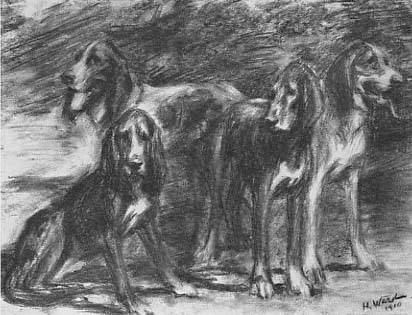
Hilda Ward, The Hounds, 1910

== Sculpture ==
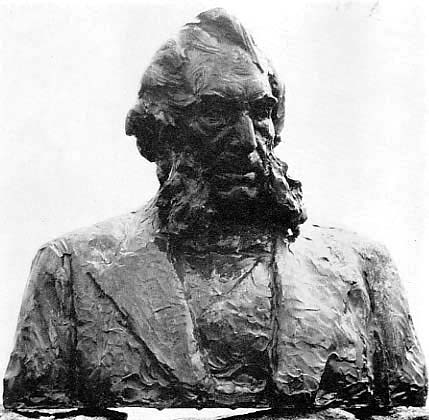
Edith Woodman Burroughs, Portrait of John Bigelow, ca. 1910

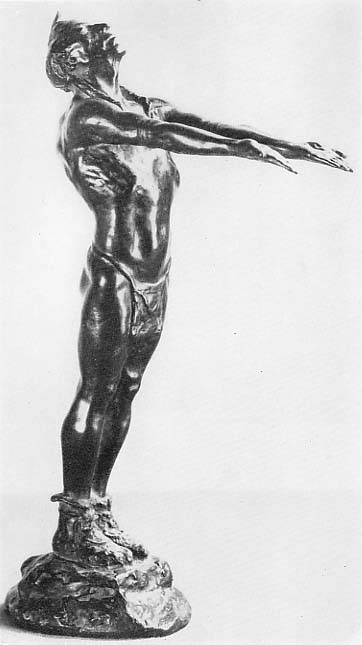
Nessa Cohen, Sunrise, bronze, exhibited at the 1913 International Exhibition of Modern Art

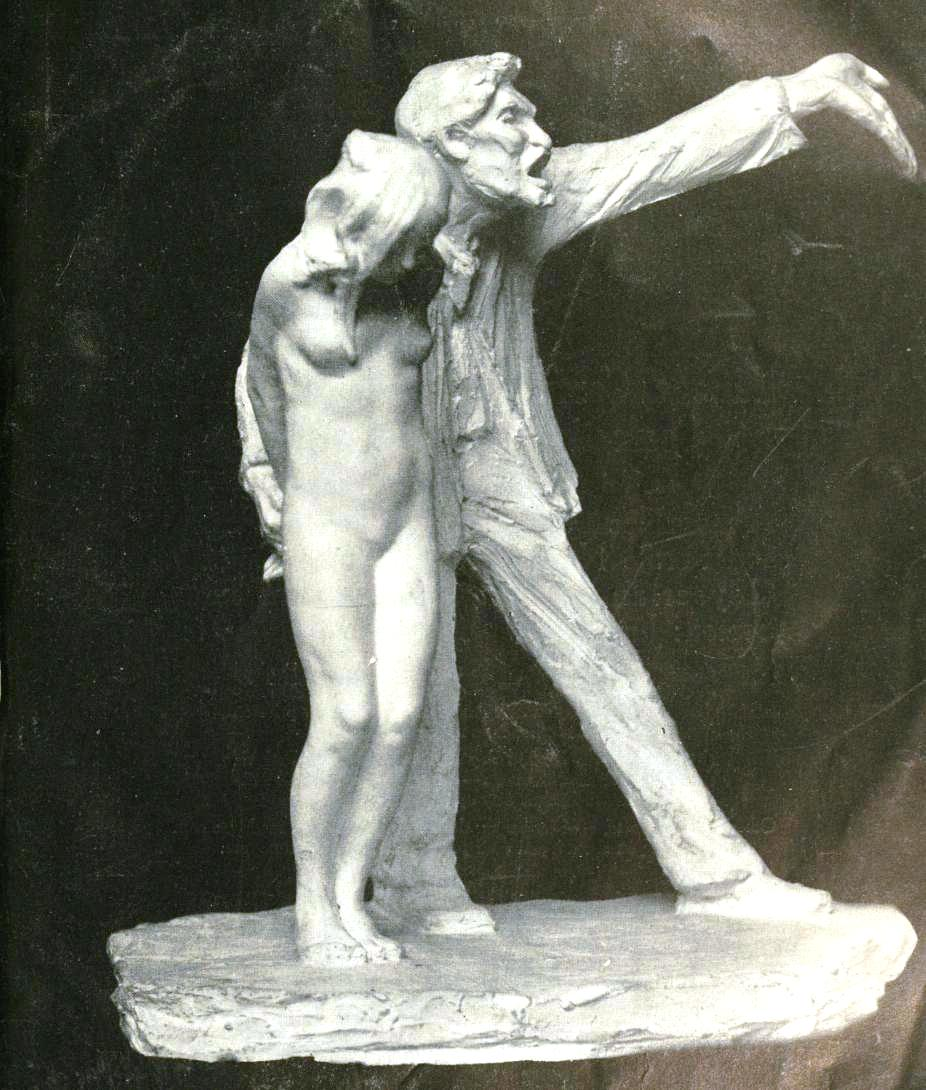
Abastenia St. Leger Eberle, The White Slave, ca. 1913
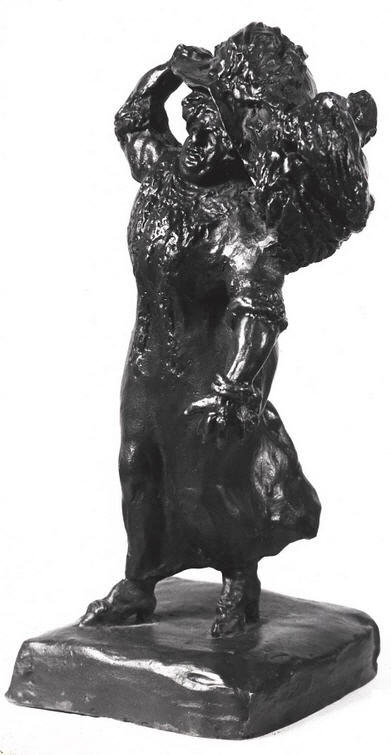
Ethel Myers, The Matron, bronze statuette

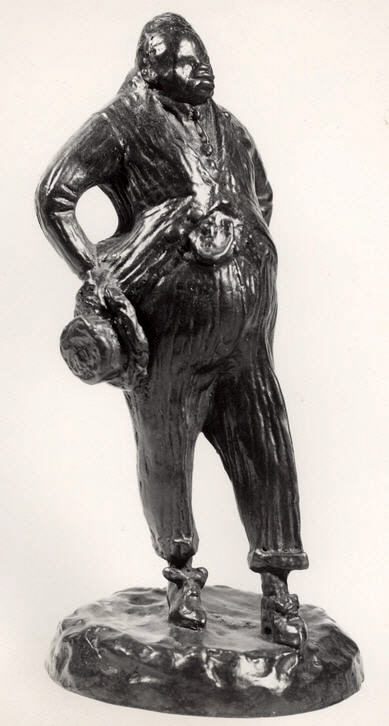
Ethel Myers,The Gambler, Joe Johnson, bronze statuette

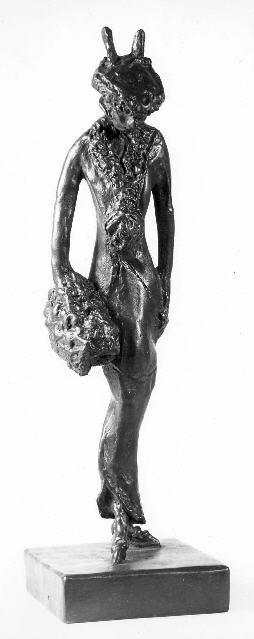
Ethel Myers,The Fifth Avenue Girl, bronze statuette
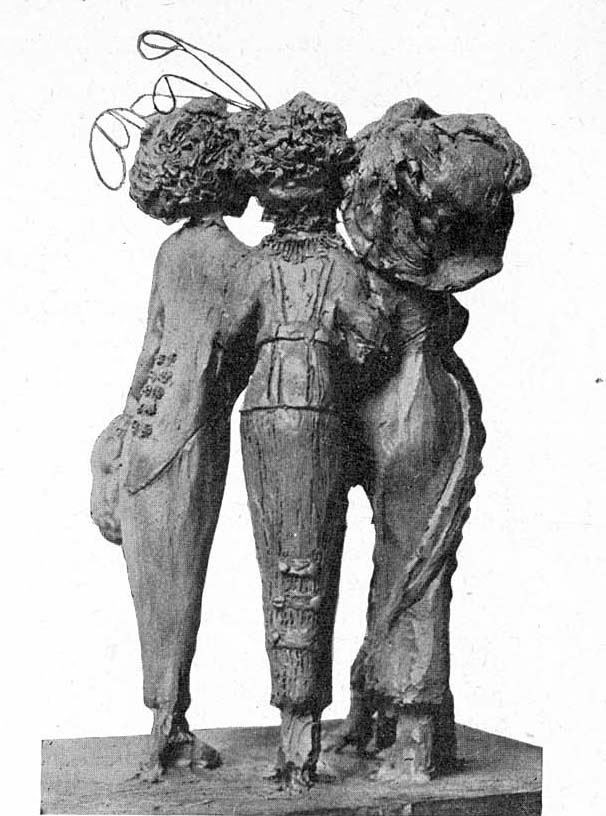
Ethel Myers, Fifth Avenue Gossips

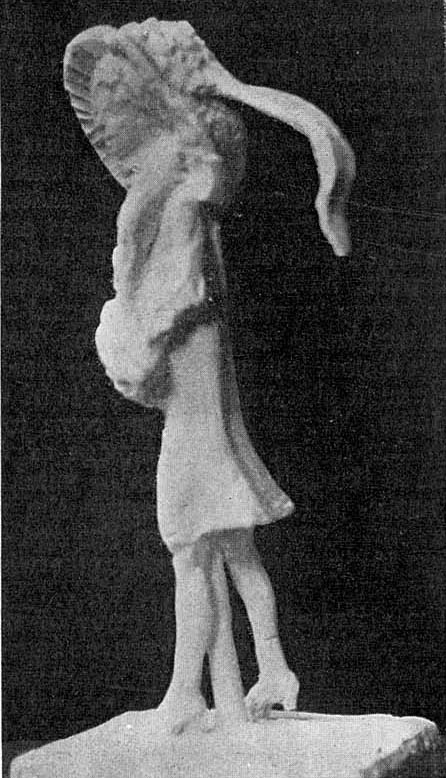
Ethel Myers, The Apprentice from Madison Avenue

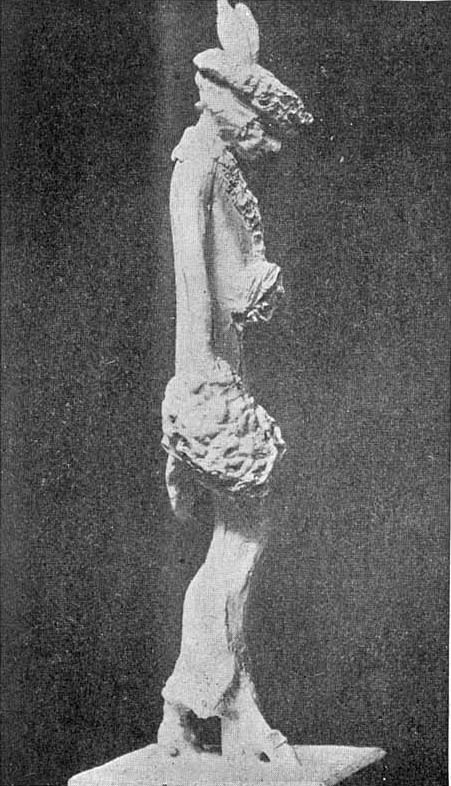
Ethel Myers, Fifth Avenue Girl.

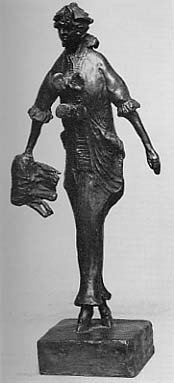
Ethel Myers, Portrait of Mrs. D. M., bronze statuette
