= Amy Londoner =

American painter

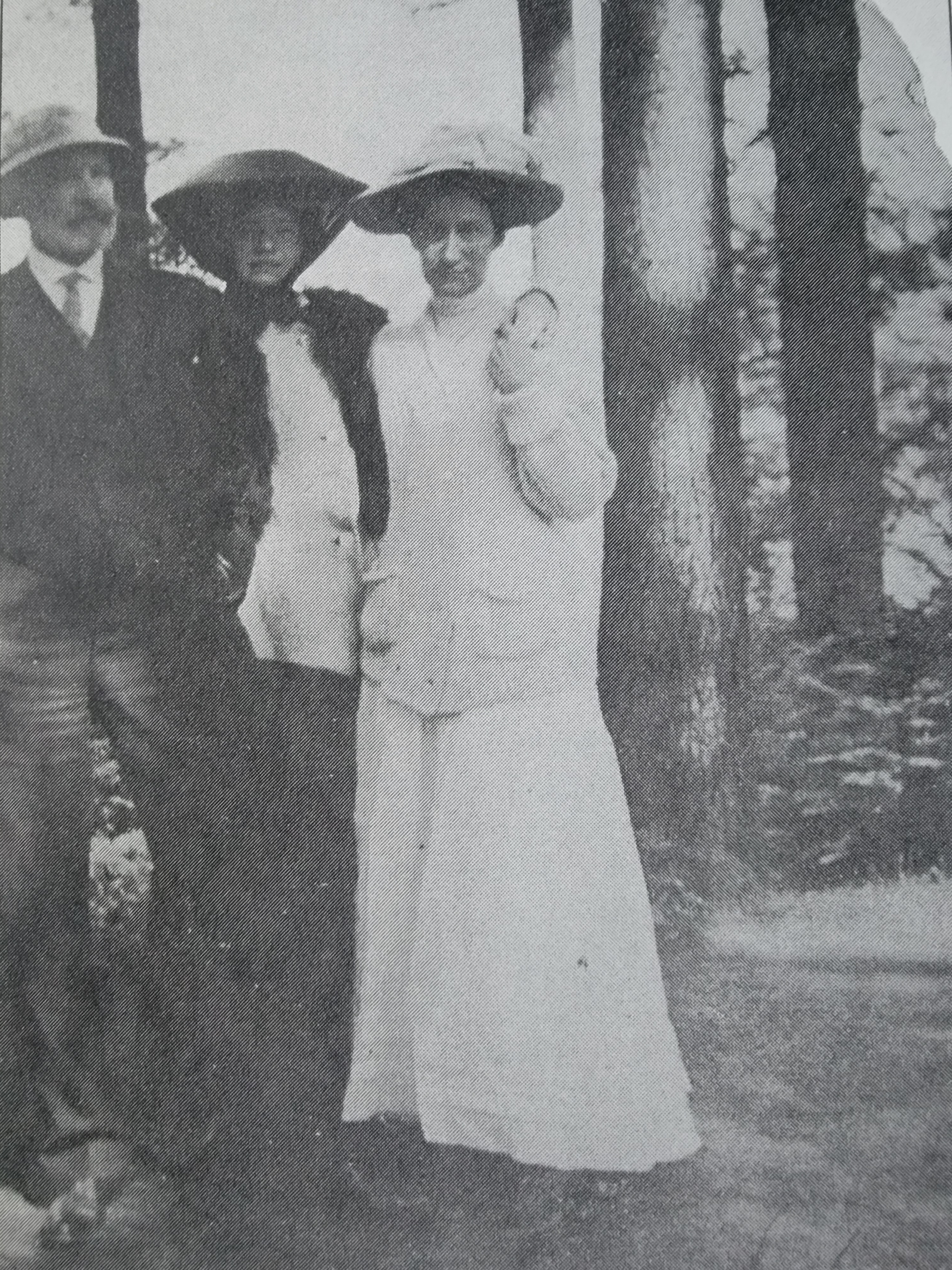
- Robert Henri, Edith Reynolds and Amy Londoner, Bear Creek Village PA
- Born: April 12, 1875; Lexington, Missouri
- Died: 1951 (aged 75–76)
- Known for: Painting
- Movement: Ash Can School

Amy Londoner (April 12, 1875 – 1951) was an American painter who exhibited at the 1913 Armory Show. One of the first students of the Henri School of Art in 1909. Prior to the Armory Show of 1913, Amy Londoner and her classmates studied with "Ashcan" painter Robert Henri at the Henri School of Art in New York, N.Y. One notable oil painting, 'The Vase', was painted by both Henri and Londoner.

== Early life ==
Londoner was born in Lexington, Missouri on April 12, 1875. (Note: Her birth date information is also give as the year 1878 (no month or day), but the passport from Londoner shows her date of birth as April 12, 1875.) Her parents were Moses and Rebecca Londoner, who moved to Leadville, Colorado, by 1880. In 1899, Amy took responsibility for her father who had come to Los Angeles from Leadville and had mental issues. By 1900, Amy was living with her parents and sister, Blanche, in the vicinity of Leadville, Denver, Colorado. While little was written about her early life, Denver City directories indicated that nineteenth-century members of the family were merchants, with family ties to New York, N.Y. The family had a male servant. Londoner traveled with her mother to England in 1907 then shortly later, both returned to New York in 1909. Londoner was 34 years old at the time, and, according to standards of the day, should have married and raised a family long before. Instead, she enrolled as one of the first students at the Henri School of Art in 1909.

At the Henri School, Londoner established friendships with Carl Sprinchorn (1887-1971), a young Swedish immigrant, and Edith Reynolds (1883-1964), daughter of wealthy industrialist family from Wilkes-Barre, PA. Londoner's correspondence, which often included references to Blanche, listed the sisters' primary address as the Hotel Endicott at 81st Street and Columbus Avenue, NYC. Other correspondence also reached Londoner in the city via Mrs. Theodore Bernstein at 252 West 74th Street; 102 West 73rd Street; and the Independent School of Art at 1947 Broadway. In 1911, Londoner vacationed at the Hotel Trexler in Atlantic City, NJ. As indicated by an undated photograph, Londoner also spent time with Edith Reynolds and Robert Henri at 'The Pines', the Reynolds family estate in Bear Creek, PA (Everhart Museum of Natural History, Science and Art, Scranton, PA).

Through her connections with the Henri School, Londoner entered progressive social and professional circles. Henri's admonition, phrased in the vocabulary of his historical time period, that one must become a "man" first and an artist second, attracted both male and female students to classes where development of unique personal styles, tailored to convey individual insights and experiences, was prized above the mastery of standardized, technical skill. Far from being dilettantes, women students at the Henri School were daring individuals willing to challenge tradition. As noted by former student Helen Appleton Read, "it was a mark of defiance...to join the radical Henri group."

As Henri offered educational alternatives for women artists, he initiated exhibition opportunities for them as well. Troubled by the exclusion of work by younger artists from annual exhibitions at the National Academy of Design, Henri was instrumental in organizing the no-jury, no-prize Exhibition of Independent Artists in 1910. About half of the 103 artists included in the exhibition were or had been Henri students, while twenty of the twenty-six women exhibiting had studied with Henri. Among the exhibition's 631 pieces, nine were by Amy Londoner, including the notorious 'Lady with a Headache'. Similarly, fourteen of Henri's women students exhibited in the groundbreaking Armory Show of 1913, forming about eight percent of the American exhibitors and one-third of American women exhibitors. Of the nine documented works submitted by Londoner, five were rejected, while four pastels of Atlantic City beach scenes, including 'The Beach Umbrellas' now in the Remington Collection, were displayed.

Following Henri's example, Londoner served as an art instructor for younger students at the Modern School, whose only requirement was to genuinely draw what they pleased. The work of dancer Isadora Duncan, another artist devoted to the ideals of a liberal education, was also lauded by the Modern School. Henri, who long admired Duncan and invited members of her troupe to model for his classes, wrote an appreciation of her for the Modern School journal in 1915. She was also the subject of Londoner's pastel Isadora Duncan and the Children: Praise Ye the Lord with Dance. In 1914, Londoner traveled to France to spend summer abroad, living at 99 rue Notre Dames des Champs, Paris, France. As the tenets of European modernism spread throughout the United States, Londoner showed regularly at venues which a new generation of artists considered increasingly passe, including the annual Society of Independent Artists' exhibitions between 1918 and 1934, and the Salons of America exhibition in 1922. Londoner also exhibited at the Morton Gallery, Opportunity Gallery, Leonard Clayton Gallery and Brownell-Lambertson Galleries in NYC. Her painting of a 'Blond Girl' was one of two works included in the College Art Associations Traveling Exhibition of 1929, which toured colleges across the country to broad acclaim.

Londoner later in life suffered from illnesses then suffered a stroke which resulted in medical bills significantly mounting over the years that her old friends from the Henri School, including Carl Sprinchorn, Florence Dreyfous, Florence Barley, and Josephine Nivison Hopper, scrambled to raise funds and find suitable long-term care facilities for Londoner. Londoner later joined Reynolds in Bear Creek, PA. Always known for her keen wit, Londoner retained her humor and concern for her works even during her illness, noting that "if anything happens to the Endicott, I guess they will just throw them out" Sprinchorn and Reynolds, however, did not allow this to happen. In 1960, Londoner's paintings 'Amsterdam Avenue at 74th Street' and 'The Builders' were loaned by Reynolds to a show commemorating the Fiftieth Anniversary of the Exhibition of Independent Artists in 1910, presented at the Delaware Art Center, Wilmington, DE. In the late 80's, Francis William Remington, 'Bill Remington', of Bear Creek Village PA, along with his neighbor and artist Frances Anstett Brennan, both had profound admiration for Amy Londoner's art work and accomplishments as a woman who played a significant role in the Ashcan movement. Remington acquired a significant number of Londoner's artwork along with Frances Anstett Brenan that later was part of an exhibition of Londoner's artwork in April 15 of 2007, at the Hope Horn Gallery, The University of Scranton, PA. We thank the detailed research and texts to accompany the exhibition compiled and edited by Darlene Miller-Lanning, PH.D, that brought Londoner's life story to those who follow the Ashcan movement.

== Education ==
She studied art in New York City with Robert Henri and John Sloan.

She was one of the women artists of the Ash Can School, several of whom also studied with Robert Henri, like Bessie Marsh.

== Career ==
Londoner was one of the artists who exhibited at the 1913 Armory Show which included four of her pastel paintings entitled The Beach Crowd, Playing Ball on the Beach, The Beach Umbrellas, The Life Guards, and The Marina Grande. Between 1912 and 1914, her works were exhibited at the MacDowell Club in New York. Her works were exhibited at the Waldorf Astoria on February 25, 1921, at the Society of Independent Artists. Her works, exhibited at a Society of Independent Artists exhibition, were described as having a "rare specialization through color and a very personal note of humor."

Londoner taught art to young children at the Modern School, a school based upon the principles of Francesc Ferrer i Guàrdia. Robert Henri taught adults at the school.

She was a member of the Art Students League.

== Works ==
Some of her works are:

- The Vase, Oil by Amy Londoner and Robert Henri, Hope L Remington-Hurley, Private Collection
- A Strange House
- The Atlantic City Board Walk Marlborough-Blenheim, Pastel, Private Collection
- Cripple Creek
- Park Bench, Oil, Private Collection
- Playing Ball on the Beach, (1913 New York Armory Show-International Exhibition Modern Art) Pastel, by 1913
- The Beach Crowd, Pastel, (1913 New York Armory Show-International Exhibition Modern Art) by 1913 Hope L Remington-Hurley, Private Collection
- The Bathers
- The Beach Umbrellas, (on back, 1913 New York Armory Show-International Exhibition Modern Art label) Pastel Hope L Remington-Hurley, Private Collection
- The Fairy Tale
- The Life Guards, (1913 New York Armory Show-International Exhibition Modern Art)Pastel, by 1913
- The Marina Grande, by 1913
- Trees and Mountains
- Woman in Black Hope L Remington-Hurley, Private Collection
- Portrait of Jo Nivison, Private Collection
- Blonde Girl, Portrait, Frank and Rosemarie Anstatt, Private Collection
- Band Concert in Atlantic City, Pastel, Hope L Remington-Hurley, Private Collection
- Children at the Fountain, Private Collection
- Amy Londoner Self Portrait, Oil, Hope L Remington-Hurley, Private Collection
- Isadora Duncan and the Children, Pastel
- Denver Park, Frank and Rosemarie Anstatt, Private Collection
- Woman with a Hat, Oil, Hope L Remington-Hurley, Private Collection
- Waiter, Oil
- Filling Lamps, Oil
- White Horses, Oil
- Evening at the Sea Shore
- Floral still life, Watercolour, Hope L Remington-Hurley, Private Collection
- Untitled (Figure with Headscarf), Oil
- Untitled (Mother and Child), Oil
- The Janitress, Oil
