= Louise Pope =

Louise Pope may refer to:

- Louise Kink (1908–1992), later Pope, one of the last remaining survivors of the sinking of the RMS Titanic
- Louise Josephine Pope, American painter
