= Alice Judson =

American painter

- Born: 1876; Beacon, New York
- Died: April 3, 1948 (aged 71–72)
- Known for: Painter
- Movement: American Impressionist

Alice Judson (1876–1948) was an American painter who specialized in landscapes of Dutchess County and seascapes of Gloucester, Massachusetts.

== Early life ==
Judson was born in Beacon, New York. She, along with her follow artist Carolyn Mase studied with impressionist landscape painter John Henry Twachtman at the Art Students League of New York.

Judson also made multiple trips to Europe, mainly Paris, in the early 20th century to continue her studies.

== Career ==
Judson's painting career flourished in the 1920s and 1930s. She was also an instructor at the Pittsburgh School of Art. She had a studio in Beacon, New York, and for the last 30 years of her life she maintained a studio in New York City at West 37th Street. Judson was a member of the Society of Independent Artists and the National Academy of Woman Painters and Sculptors

== Death ==
Alice Judson died on April 3, 1948, and is buried at St. Luke's Episcopal Church Cemetery in Beacon.
