= Aaron Ward (sailor) =

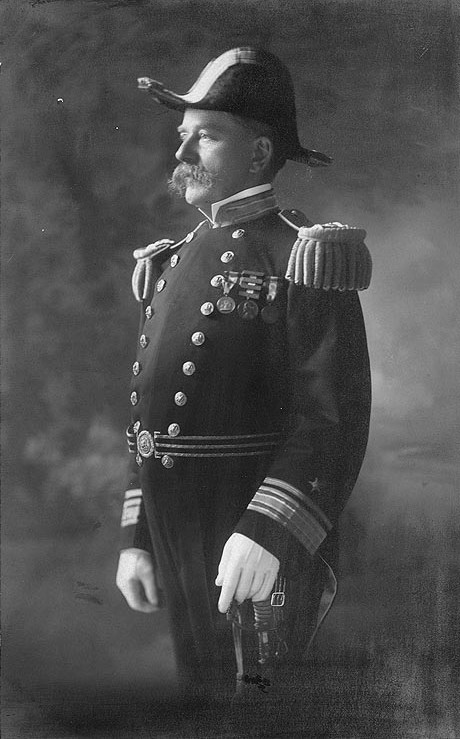
- Born: October 10, 1851; Philadelphia, Pennsylvania
- Died: July 5, 1918 (aged 66)
- Burial place: Green-Wood Cemetery, Brooklyn; 40°39′N 73°59′W
- Military career
- Allegiance: United States of America
- Branch: United States Navy
- Service years: 1871–1913
- Rank: Rear admiral
- Commands: Wasp; Panther; Yorktown; Don Juan de Austria; Pennsylvania
- Conflicts: Spanish–American War

Rear Admiral Aaron Ward (October 10, 1851 – July 5, 1918) was an officer in the United States Navy during the late 19th and early 20th centuries. He served during the Spanish–American War.

== Early years ==
Aaron Ward was born in Philadelphia, Pennsylvania, and was the son of Brigadier General Ward B. Burnett who had served as the colonel of 2nd New York Volunteers during the Mexican War and also served as a brigadier general in the New York militia during the Civil War. Ward took the name of his maternal grandfather Major General Aaron Ward of the New York Militia.

Ward entered the United States Naval Academy with the rank of midshipman on September 28, 1867, graduating on June 6, 1871.

== Career ==
He was ordered to the steam frigate California on the Pacific Squadron, and was promoted to ensign on July 14, 1872. He next served in steam sloop Brooklyn in the West Indies from 1873 to 1874, before reporting to the screw frigate Franklin on the European Station, and was promoted to master on February 8, 1875.

Ward served a tour of duty at the Naval Academy from 1876 to 1879. Next, he served with the Constitution training squadron from 1879 through 1882, receiving his commission as lieutenant on November 25, 1881.

Ward was occupied with various professional duties at the Naval Torpedo Station in Newport, Rhode Island, and the New York Navy Yard through 1885. From 1885 to 1888 he was stationed in the sloops Hartford and Monongahela on the Pacific Station. Between 1889 and 1894, Ward served as naval attaché in Paris, Berlin, and St. Petersburg. He sailed with armored cruiser New York in the West Indies and Brazil until 1894, and in the protected cruiser San Francisco in the Mediterranean through 1896.

== Spanish–American War ==
During the Spanish–American War, Ward commanded the armed yacht Wasp. Commended for gallantry, he was advanced to lieutenant commander on March 3, 1899, for conspicuous service at the Battle of Santiago de Cuba.

== Later career ==
He then commanded the auxiliary cruiser Panther for a year in the West Indies, followed by service as chief of staff to the Asiatic Squadron commander. From 1901 to 1908, Ward commanded the gunboats Yorktown and Don Juan de Austria, and then the armored cruiser Pennsylvania, successively. He served for one year as a supervisor of the harbor in New York before becoming an aide to the Secretary of the Navy in 1909.

In 1910 Ward was promoted to rear admiral. In 1911 he became second in command of the Atlantic Fleet.

Rear Admiral Ward retired on October 10, 1913, having reached the mandatory retirement age of 62.

== Retirement ==
In 1914 Ward commanded the ship Red Cross which was sponsored by the American Red Cross and carried physicians and nurses to provide medical aid to wounded and sick soldiers and civilians of all nationalities. Emperor Franz Joseph awarded Ward the Austro-Hungarian Medal of Merit for his service in the capacity.

In retirement, Ward lived at his home, named Willowmere, in Roslyn Harbor, New York, where he pursued his hobby of cultivating roses.

He was a member of the General Society of Colonial Wars and a hereditary member of the Aztec Club of 1847.

== Death ==
Admiral Ward died on July 5, 1918, and is buried in Green-Wood Cemetery, Brooklyn, New York City.

== Family ==
Ward married Annie Cairns Willis and was the father of six children. Four of his children died during childhood. When his son Frankie (1877-1880) died when he was only three and a half, Ward had a life-size statue placed on his grave. His two daughters who reached maturity were artist Hilda Ward and Edna Ward Capps the wife of Rear Admiral Washington Lee Capps.

== Awards ==
- Sampson Medal
- Spanish Campaign Medal
- Philippine Campaign Medal
- Medal of Merit (Austria-Hungary)

== Legacy ==
Three United States Navy ships have been named after Admiral Aaron Ward -

- USS Aaron Ward (DD-132), served between 1919 and 1940 and then became HMS Castleton.
- USS Aaron Ward (DD-483), served between 1942 and her sinking by Japanese bombers in 1943.
- USS Aaron Ward (DM-34), was a destroyer minelayer that served in 1944 and 1945.

== See also ==
- USS Aaron Ward for ships named in his honor.
- Rosa 'Mrs. Aaron Ward' (Pernet-Ducher, 1907) was named after his wife,
- Rosa 'Willowmere' (Pernet-Ducher, 1913) was named after his property in Roslyn.
