= Mary Rogers (artist) =

American painter and sculptor

Mary "Maize" C Gamble Rogers
- Born: May 7, 1882
- Died: 1920 (aged 37–38); New York City, New York
- Education: Studied with Robert Henri in New York City and with Lucien Simon and Émile-René Ménard in Paris
- Known for: Painter and sculptor

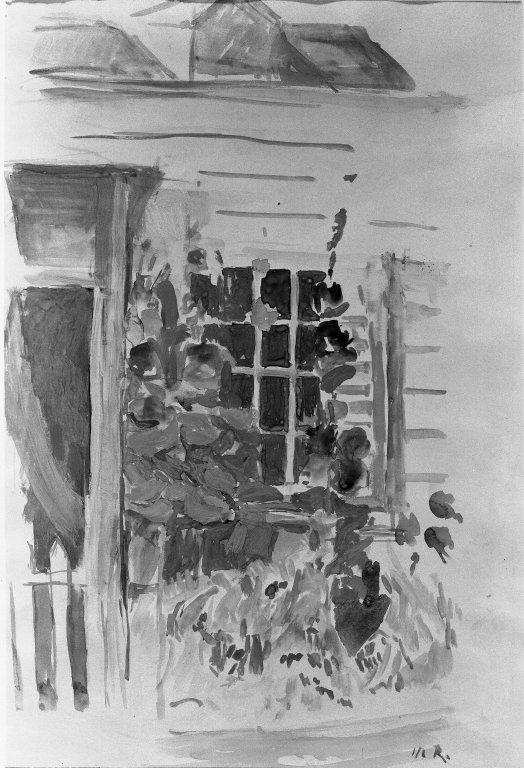
Black and white reproduction of Cottage Window, Watercolor, Brooklyn Museum

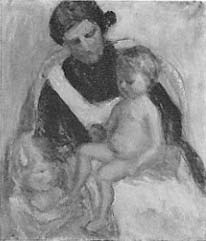
Black and white photograph of Mary Rogers' Portrait, exhibited at the 1913 Armory Show

Mary "Maize" C Gamble Rogers (May 7, 1882 – 1920) was an American painter. She painted in watercolor and oil, and was known for still lifes, miniatures, landscapes, and cityscapes of New York City. She was one of the founders and directors of the Society of Independent Artists. Her works were included in the 1910 Exhibition of Independent Artists, the 1913 Armory Show, and in memorial exhibitions after her early death.

== Early life and education ==
Mary Rogers was born May 7, 1882, in either Pittsburgh, Pennsylvania or Louisville, Kentucky. She and her sister Catherine Rogers lived for a time in Pittsburgh, Pennsylvania, where Mary studied at the School of Design and was a member of the Arts Students League. She studied with Robert Henri in New York City and again in France. During a trip to Europe in 1907, she also worked with Lucien Simon and Émile-René Ménard in Paris and with Frank Brangwyn in London. She and her sister traveled extensively in the United States and in Europe.

== Career ==
Mary Rogers was one of the founders and directors of the Society of Independent Artists. She participated in the 1910 Exhibition of Independent Artists, organized by Robert Henri and others, in which 28 of the 97 artists whose works were displayed were women. Rogers was one of the artists who exhibited at the landmark Armory Show of 1913. The show included one of her oil paintings, Portrait ($150). She also exhibited at the Panama Pacific Exhibition of 1915 and the National Academy of Design.

According to her sister, Mary Rogers was highly critical of her own work, and destroyed as many as two-thirds of the works she had made during the summer before her death. Not long after her death, a substantial number of her works were chosen for a show at the Brooklyn Museum. In 1921, a "Mary Rogers Memorial Exhibition" was held at the Waldorf Astoria New York, with the support of the Society of Independent Artists.

Robert Henri described Rogers as "not only an artist of ability but of importance" and applauded the "spiritual" nature of her technique. She is noted as having been one of the "ablest and most faithful executives" of the Society of Independent Artists, and "one who had borne a considerable share of its work from the first days of its existence."

== Selected works ==
- Little girl in a blue smock, Museum of Fine Arts, St. Petersburg, Florida
- A little American, Brooklyn Museum, Brooklyn, New York
- Cottage Window, Brooklyn Museum, Brooklyn, New York
- Portrait, private collection, Clearwater, Florida

== Other sources ==
- Lesko, Diane (1994). Mary Rogers: an American modernist rediscovered (Exhibition Catalog). St. Petersburg, Florida: Museum of Fine Arts.
- Finding aid to Mary Rogers, 1882-1920 Papers, Art & Artist files, Smithsonian Libraries
