= Florence Howell Barkley =

American painter

- Born: Mary Florence Barkley; 1880; Maysville, Kentucky
- Died: 1954 (aged 73–74); East Northfield, Massachusetts
- Education: Art Academy of Cincinnati
- Known for: Painting, watercolor, Illustration
- Notable work: Jerome Avenue Bridge, oil painting
- Movement: Modernist

Florence Howell Barkley (1880–1954) was an American landscape painter and illustrator best known for depictions of seascapes in oil and watercolor and illustrations in many popular newspapers in pen and ink. During this time, she was one of few women who was able to receive formal training in the arts. Although her most well-known work was created in 1912 and exhibited in 1913, her career was disrupted by World War I, and thereafter consisted mostly of freelance illustration work.

== Early life ==
Florence Howell Barkley was born Mary Florence Barkley in Maysville, Kentucky, on February 17, 1880, to Henry Clay Barkley, an Irish immigrant and hardware worker, and Isabella Imogene Howell. She and her seven siblings grew up in Maysville and all attended school. After the death of her parents in 1897, Barkley lived with her sister Helen, her brother Frank, her brother Harry, and his wife Lillie. Her brothers opened up a small shoe store, H.C. Barkley & Company, while she and her sister kept house. During this time, Barkley and her sister Helen began to create paintings of landscapes and floral arrangements in watercolor and pastel that they would submit to contests in the Mason County Fair. Barkley lived in Maysville with siblings until she was 20 years old.

== Education ==
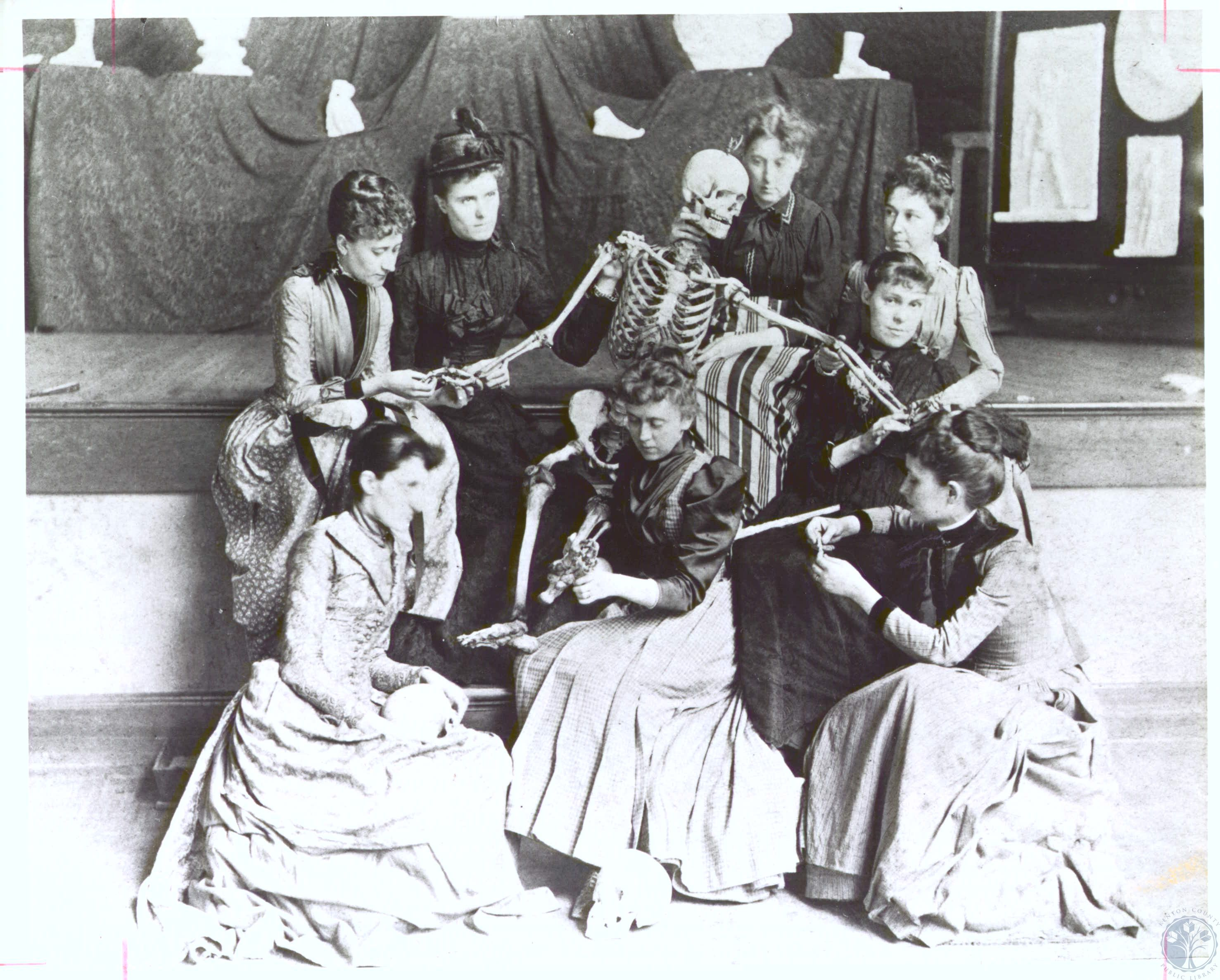
Frank Duveneck's class, Art Academy of Cincinnati, estimate 1890-1912

In 1900, at the age of 20, Barkley moved to Cincinnati to study art. She was educated at the Art Academy of Cincinnati, where she studied landscape painting.

Barkley then attended the Philadelphia School of Design for Women, she was one of many women to be trained by Robert Henri. Henri aided in the development of female modernism as his students applied his modernist ideals across different media. Barkley flourished under his instruction, then creating some of her most famous works. She was friendly with several other notable female artists at the school, including Josephine Hopper and Henrietta Shore.

== Career ==
Barkley moved to New York City to work for The World as an illustrator. She worked as an illustrator part-time and created landscape paintings in her free time.

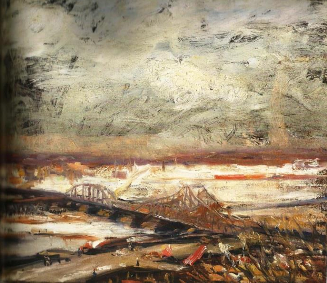
Florence Howell Barkley, Jerome Avenue Bridge, Armory Show of 1913

Barkley's most notable work is the landscape painting, "Jerome Avenue Bridge". This oil painting depicts the Macombs Dam Bridge, located in The Bronx, near her residence. Originally titled "Landscape over the City", this work, priced at $100, was exhibited in Gallery E of the Armory Show in 1913. It was shown near works of Arthur Bowen Davies, Walt Kuhn, and Joseph Stella. Barkley was one of fifty women whose work was exhibited at the show.

Two of her works were exhibited from April 10 to May 6, 1917, as part of the First Annual Exhibition of The Society of Independent Artists at Grand Central Palace, New York City.

At the beginning of her career, World War I broke out and she stopped painting and worked for the Red Cross.

Barkley was employed after the war, in 1921, by New York's Century Illustrated Monthly Magazine. She created illustrations for hundreds of articles. Her illustration style was modern with loose strokes and slightly abstracted figures. The Century Monthly stated that "the flaky style of Florence Howell Barkley is charming." At this point in her career, Barkley worked almost entirely in black and white pen and ink. She lived in New York's 15th Ward with Grace James, also an artist.

In 1930, Barkley's widowed sister, Helen and niece Isabel moved to New York to live with Barkley. She supported Helen and Isabel, who took care of their apartment, through freelance illustration jobs.

== Death and legacy ==
Barkley died in 1954 at the age of 74 in East Northfield, Massachusetts.

Her work is included in the Museum of the City of New York. Her paintings are expressive, romantic, and showcase the introduction of female artwork into American modernism.
