= Hermine E. Kleinert =

American painter

- Born: May 17, 1880
- Died: July 28, 1943 (aged 63); Woodstock, New York
- Known for: Painting
- Awards: Art award given out annually on May 17 in her memory

Hermine E. Kleinert (May 17, 1880 – July 28, 1943) was an American painter and artist.

== Biography ==
Kleinert lived and worked in New York City. She was also a member of the Woodstock art colony. Her landscape and portrait pieces were displayed at the Woodstock Artists Association Museum. Throughout her artistic career her work was featured in The Armory Show at 100, the Whitney Museum, and others. She was part of the Whitney's 3rd Biennial Exhibition of Contemporary American Painting in 1936. Her work was also part of a 20@th anniversary celebration of the Bezalel school of Arts and Crafts.

She died on July 28, 1943, in Woodstock. An art award in her memory, is given out annually on her birthdate, May 17.
