= Hilda Ward =

American painter

- Born: 1878; Annapolis, Maryland, U.S.
- Died: 1950 (aged 71–72); New York, New York, U.S.
- Known for: Painting

Hilda Ward (1878–1950) American Expressionist painter and author. She studied with Robert Henri and exhibited in the 1910 New York Exhibition of Independent Artists and the 1913 Armory Show. Ward also wrote A Girl and the Motor.

== Early life ==
Hilda Ward was born in Annapolis, Maryland, the daughter of Rear Admiral Aaron Ward.

Ward studied in New York City with Robert Henri. Her friends included William Glackens and John French Sloan.

== Career ==
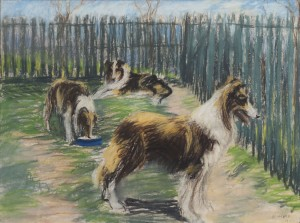
Hilda Ward, The Hound, 1910

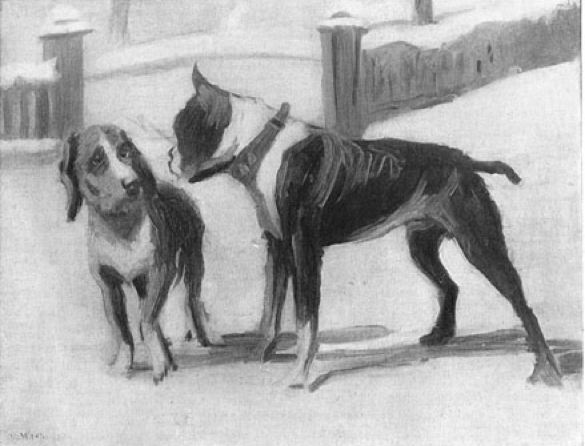
Hilda Ward, The Tenant's Dog, 1910

Ward exhibited at the 1910 New York Exhibition of Independent Artists, showing The Tenant's Dog. Ward was also one of the artists who exhibited at the Armory Show of 1913. The show included two of her pieces, The Hound and The Kennels, one of which was a pastel and the other a drawing.

Ward was the author of a 1908 book entitled A Girl and the Motor, which chronicled her experiences as a woman driver and mechanic during the early years of the Automobile Age. She was, upon occasion, to include automobiles in the paintings.

== Personal life ==
Ward lived in Roslyn, Long Island. She died in 1950.
