= Nessa Cohen =

American sculptor

- Born: 1885, 1855; New York City
- Died: 16 December 1976, 1915 (aged 90–91); New York City
- Alma mater: Barnard College; Art Students League of New York
- Occupation: Sculptor

Nessa Cohen, born Helen Nessa Cohen, (December 11, 1885 – December 1976) was an American sculptor, born in New York City. She exhibited in the 1913 International Exhibition of Modern Art.

== Early life ==
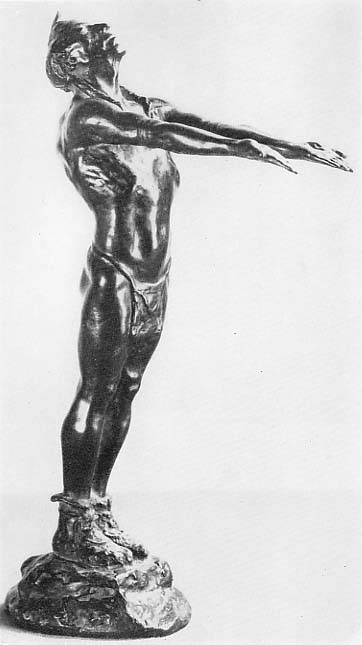
Nessa Cohen, Sunrise, bronze, exhibited at the 1913 International Exhibition of Modern Art

Cohen was born on December 11, 1884, in New York City. Her parents were Pauline and Adolph Cohen, who were both of German and Russian heritage. Her father was a lawyer born in Germany. She had an older sister named Sadie.

== Education ==
A graduate of Barnard College, Cohen studied sculpture with James Earle Fraser at the Art Students League and at the Cooper Union. She also studied with Despiau and Charles Malfray in Paris.

== Career ==
Before 1913 the American Museum of Natural History provided monies to Cohen so that she and other artists could travel to the southwest to study individuals from six Native American tribes to capture their clothes and features. The resulting works included Sunrise. The sketches that she presented to the museum so that they could assess her skills before sending her to the southwest resulted in the Hopi Relay Runner.

Cohen showed three pieces at the 1913 International Exhibition of Modern Art in New York, two plaster pieces Age and Portrait and the bronze Sunrise.

Comment on New York Evening Sun art critics

The critics say that her work is as good as a man's, which is a way critics have when they wish to pay a greatest compliment that a critic's phrasing can devise.

— Laura R. Prieto

Sunrise was also exhibited at the 1916 Annual American Exhibition in Chicago, as was the bronze The Velvet Cap, Joy and Card tray: Hospitality.

She was a member of the National Sculpture Society and exhibited a piece, Moment Musicale in the society's 1923 show. Cohen was also a member of the National Association of Women Painters and Sculptors, New York Architectural League and the Society of Independent Artists. Her work was also part of the sculpture event in the art competition at the 1928 Summer Olympics.

She traveled to Italy and France.

== Death ==
Cohen died in December, 1976. She donated funds to the Art Students League of New York for the Nessa Cohen Memorial Fund for art students' housing, education and travel expenses.

== Works ==
- Age, plaster
- Card tray: Hospitality
- Group of Indians of Southwestern United States, American Museum of Natural History.
- Joy
- Navajo Watching Women at Work
- Portrait, plaster
- Sunrise, bronze, Havana, Cuba
- The Velvet Cap
