= Edith L. King =

American painter

Edith Lawrence King
- Born: 1884; Chelsea, Massachusetts
- Died: 1975 (Aged 91); Southbury, Connecticut
- Occupation: Painter

Edith Lawrence King (1884–1975) was an American painter born in Chelsea, Massachusetts. Spending most of her childhood in Chelsea, Massachusetts and Belmont, Massachusetts she eventually moved to Cambridge, Massachusetts in order to pursue her education at the Massachusetts Institute of Technology (MIT). Part way through her education at the Massachusetts Institute of Technology, however, she moved to Providence, Rhode Island, in order to complete her education at Rhode Island School of Design (RISD). The Rhode Island School of Design is one of the oldest and most prodigious fine arts and design schools in the nation and here she learned under Maurice Prendergast. After completing her degree King moved to New York City, New York, in order to further pursue her career as a painter. During this time King was invited to exhibit her work at the famous Armory Show of 1913. After this King continued to pursue painting as her career before eventually settling down in Cambridge, Massachusetts where she worked at the Buckingham School in Massachusetts. Here she worked until she moved to New York City, New York with her friend Dorothy Coit, and here they founded the King-Coit Children's Theatre and School in 1923. Here King worked as an educator and part-time painter until her retirement in 1959. Upon retiring King moved to the countryside of Southbury, Connecticut where she died at the age of 91 in 1975.

== Education ==
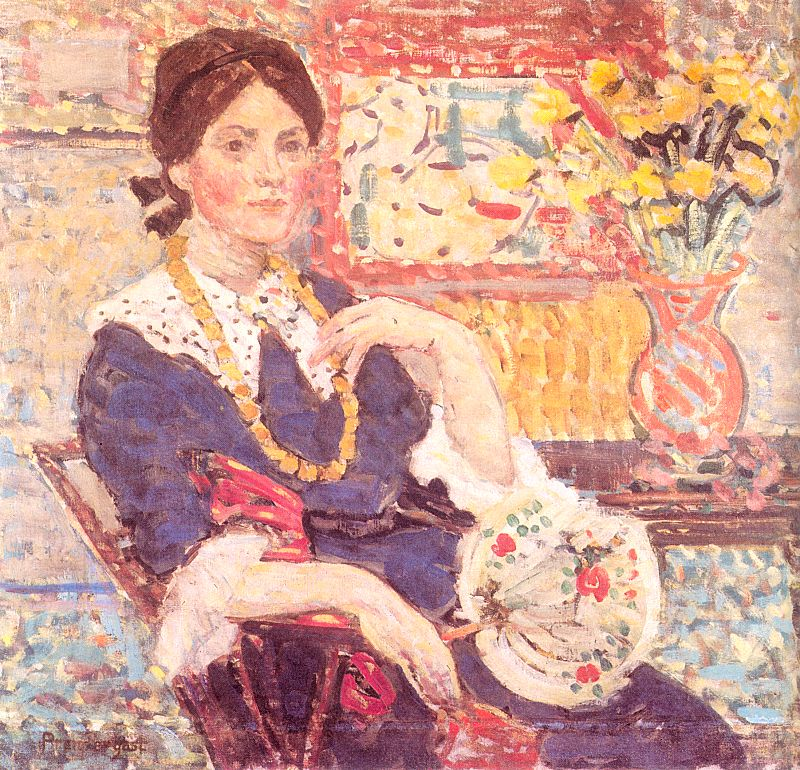
La Rogue: Portrait of Miss Edith King by Maurice Prendergast

Born in Chelsea, Massachusetts, but raised in Belmont, Massachusetts, King excelled in her studies throughout her early childhood, eventually attending the Massachusetts Institute of Technology before transferring to Rhode Island School of Design in order to focus on her career for painting. Here she studied under Maurice Prendergast, who was an esteemed Post-Impressionist American painter who worked with the painting mediums of monotype, oil, and watercolor. Two of Prendergast's mediums eventually became King's primary painting medium as oil and watercolor were what she primarily used for her pieces. Later on in life King went on to found the King-Coit School and Children's theater alongside Dorothy Coit. During this time King would attend Harvard Summer School in order to further her capabilities as an instructor and sharpen her painting and drawing capabilities.

== Armory Show of 1913 ==
The historical Armory Show of 1913 was one of the first American exhibitions to showcase a form of art that had yet to reach the United States. The first large-scale exhibition of modern art in America this exhibition showcased the artistic movement known as cubism which made artists like Pablo Picasso and Georges Braque so famous. Both Picasso and Braque had paintings on display at the Armory Show. There were nearly 300 artists on display at the Armory Show and among these painters were other modern powerhouses like Vincent Van Gogh, Oscar-Claude Monet, and Theodore Robinson, amongst others. All in all, the Armory Show of 1913 showcased nearly 1300 art pieces from 300 artists. King exhibited five of her watercolors which were entitled Statue at Ravello ($50), Bathing hours, Capri, ($50), The bathers, Capri ($50), The Piccola Marina, Capri ($50), and The Marina Grande, ($50). King was one of only 48 women who were invited to showcase their talents at this all-important exhibition. Edith was able to sell every piece she had on display, her involvement in the show paved the way for women in the modern art scene.

== Exhibitions post Armory Show ==
King continued to have notable success after the Armory Show in terms of fame and exhibitions. Following the Armory Show King was invited in early 1915 to showcase her paintings at the Panama-Pacific International Exposition (PPIE) in San Francisco. The Panama-Pacific International Exposition was the World's Fair that was held in San Francisco, California during the time span of February 20 to December 4, 1915. The Panama-Pacific International Exposition was held in order to celebrate the completion of the Panama Canal, but it was also used to showcase the recovery of San Francisco from the 1906 earthquake and subsequent fire which destroyed a large portion of the city. This World's Fair was also held in order to showcase American ingenuity and American skill and talent. Thus, Edith Lawrence King was invited to showcase her art once again. After the Panama-Pacific International Exposition King was invited to show her at the Art Institute of Chicago (AIC) in their 28th annual art exhibition from November 1915 to January 1916. This exhibition was meant to showcase some of the American art which was on display at the Panama-Pacific International Exposition World's Fair. Due to this, King, alongside a couple dozen others, was selected to have her art displayed at the Art Institute of Chicago. Her art, alongside her peers, was put on display at the Art Institute of Chicago's gallery as well as on a book which was sold at the event. This book contained some of the most prominent pieces displayed at the Art Institute of Chicago's 28th annual art exhibition alongside a description of the piece and a short biography of the artist who made the painting. Following this exhibition, however, King was scarcely, if at all, invited to put her paintings on display at a significant exhibition again.

== Life after exhibitions ==
Following her exhibition at the Art Institute of Chicago, King was unable to showcase her work at a significant exhibition again. After several years of failed attempts to reestablish herself in the mainstream art world King began to shift her professional work focus. Following several years spent struggling as an artist King began her employment at Buckingham School in Massachusetts. At the Buckingham School in Massachusetts King served as a notable art teacher and participated heavily in the arts program beyond just painting and drawing. Here she would go on to meet her fellow teacher and eventual business partner Dorothy Coit (1889–1979) who was a theater teacher at the school. During this time Dorothy Coit and King began collaborating together in order to put together children's theater productions in collaboration with the school. This endeavor was incredibly fruitful for both Coit and King and they were able to put together enough money to found the King-Coit Children's Theatre and School.

== King-Coit Children's Theatre and School ==
Edith Lawrence King and Dorothy Coit founded the King-Coit School and Children's Theater in 1923, which continued to operate until 1959. This theater school aimed to provide young children aged 5 to 15 an arts program on weekdays and weekends. At this school King focused on teaching the students drawing and painting and Dorothy Coit focused on teaching them acting and dancing. The King-Coit Children's Theatre and School was a fine arts school in the area during the time as it had a relatively well-known student body. People like Anne Baxter, Madeleine L’Engle, and Lee Ramick, alongside others, are some of the most notable students to attend the King-Coit Children's Theatre and School.

The school not only focused on teaching the students how to sing, dance, draw, and paint but it also put on productions with the students in order to showcase the talents of the students as well as the teachings of the school. Early productions include Comus in 1915, the Tempest, and Aucassin and Nicolette. The theater was located at 39th Street in New York City, New York. Stars such as Jane Wyatt had their starts in these fledgling productions.

The King-Coit Children's Theatre and School focused on emerging its students into the time periods in which the productions were set, which went as far as ensuring the students focused their studies solely on the music and artworks of the time. The hope behind this was to make it so that the children would feel comfortable in the time era and could thus act out the productions more accurately and naturally. The pre-production phase is also notable for only giving out the roles for plays mere days before the play was set to be put on, which only succeeded because the students were expected to spend weeks repeatedly going over the script until they had the entirety of it memorized.

While this form of teaching and immersion was mainly for the on-stage performance of the plays which was Dorothy Coit's area of expertise, this teaching style benefited King as well. During their immersion into the culture of the time period the children would paint and draw landscapes, monuments, and scenes of the time period and location in which the play was set in. These paintings and drawings would serve as inspiration for the set pieces and set design as well as the costume designs that King was responsible for creating, though the children who created the inspiration for the set pieces, set designs, and costume designs often had little to no say in the finished product of the designs.

Edith L. King's techniques helped the King-Coit Children's Theatre and School have some of the best reviewed plays among all the children theaters in the nation.

Although the student body was composed of incredibly rich and famous people, the King-Coit Children's Theatre and School struggled to turn a profit from its plays and schooling. Save for a select few productions which were played on Broadway, the plays put on by the school were short run productions which were primarily put on in small theatres with limited capacity. The lack of ticket sales due to capacity limitations, the length of time it took to put on each play due to the unique pre-production phase, and the limited number of students meant that the school relied heavily on private donations and grants in order to continue its operations.

== Retirement and death ==
In 1959, due to several health issues, King retired from her job at the King-Coit Children's Theatre and School. Following her retirement Dorothy Coit refused to continue the King-Coit Children's Theatre and School without her longtime friend and business partner. Thus, in 1959, the King-Coit Children's Theatre and School closed its doors for the last time. Following her retirement King moved from the busy urban life of New York City and moved to the more rural town of Southbury, Connecticut. Here she lived out the remainder of her life until she died in 1975. She was 91 years of age at the time of her death. Following her death 20 volumes of King's photographs were donated to the New York Public Library for the Performing Arts in New York, as well as to the Harvard Library in Cambridge, Massachusetts.

== Legacy ==
Often overshadowed by more prominent names of her time, King remains one of the most important female artists of the early 20th century. After her success at the Armory Show, she struggled to establish herself in the art world and took on teaching work to support herself. Though struggling financially shortened her career, she continued to shape the fine arts through her teaching at the Buckingham School in Massachusetts and the King-Coit Children's Theatre and School. Even while teaching, she maintained a deep commitment to her art, leaving behind dozens of paintings and photographs now held in museums across the country.
