= Abastenia St. Leger Eberle =

American sculptor (1878–1942)

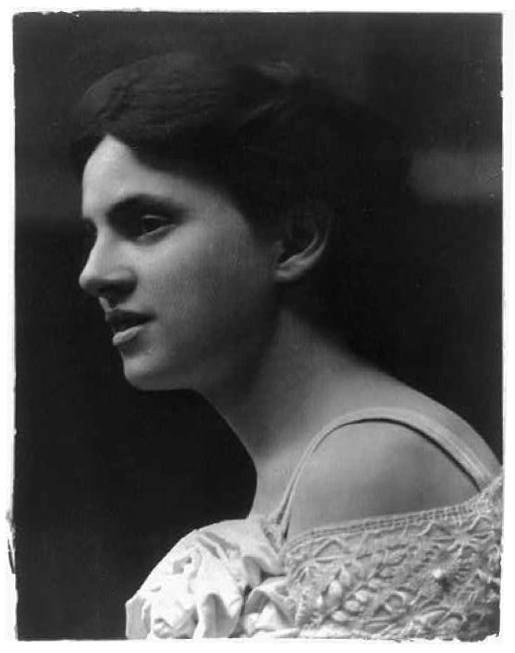
- Born: April 6, 1878; Webster City, Iowa, United States
- Died: February 26, 1942 (aged 63); New York City
- Known for: Sculpture
- Notable work: Girl Skating (1907); White Slave (1913)
- Movement: Ashcan School; New Sculpture; Realism

Abastenia St. Leger Eberle (April 6, 1878 – February 26, 1942) was an American sculptor known for her energetic, small bronze sculptures depicting poor immigrants on New York's City's Lower East Side. As an artist, Eberle had strong beliefs and felt a need for artists to create politically and socially conscious works of art that reflected contemporary issues. Eberle spent much of her life working toward equal rights for American women and a widespread push for equality. Her most famous piece, The White Slave, representing child prostitution, caused controversy when exhibited at the 1913 Armory Show.

== Early life ==
Born on April 6, 1878, in Webster City, Iowa, Mary Abastenia St. Leger was the daughter of a mother who was a musician and father who was a doctor in the US Army. Her family later moved to Kansas, then Missouri, before settling in Canton, Ohio. She initially studied to become a professional musician, but her father noticed her talent for modeling. He showed some interest in her development, but never offered Eberle much financial backing during her lifetime.

Eberle's mother offered piano lessons and encouraged her to pursue her musical talent, which she displayed at a young age. Eberle pursued cello professionally, until one day her father was so impressed with a clay mask Eberle worked out that he acquired some modeling wax for her from a patient who made busts. Confident that she would quickly achieve talent in sculpture, Eberle stated, "I knew it [sculpture] was my work." She received lessons from this patient before enrolling at the Art Students League in New York.

== Early career ==
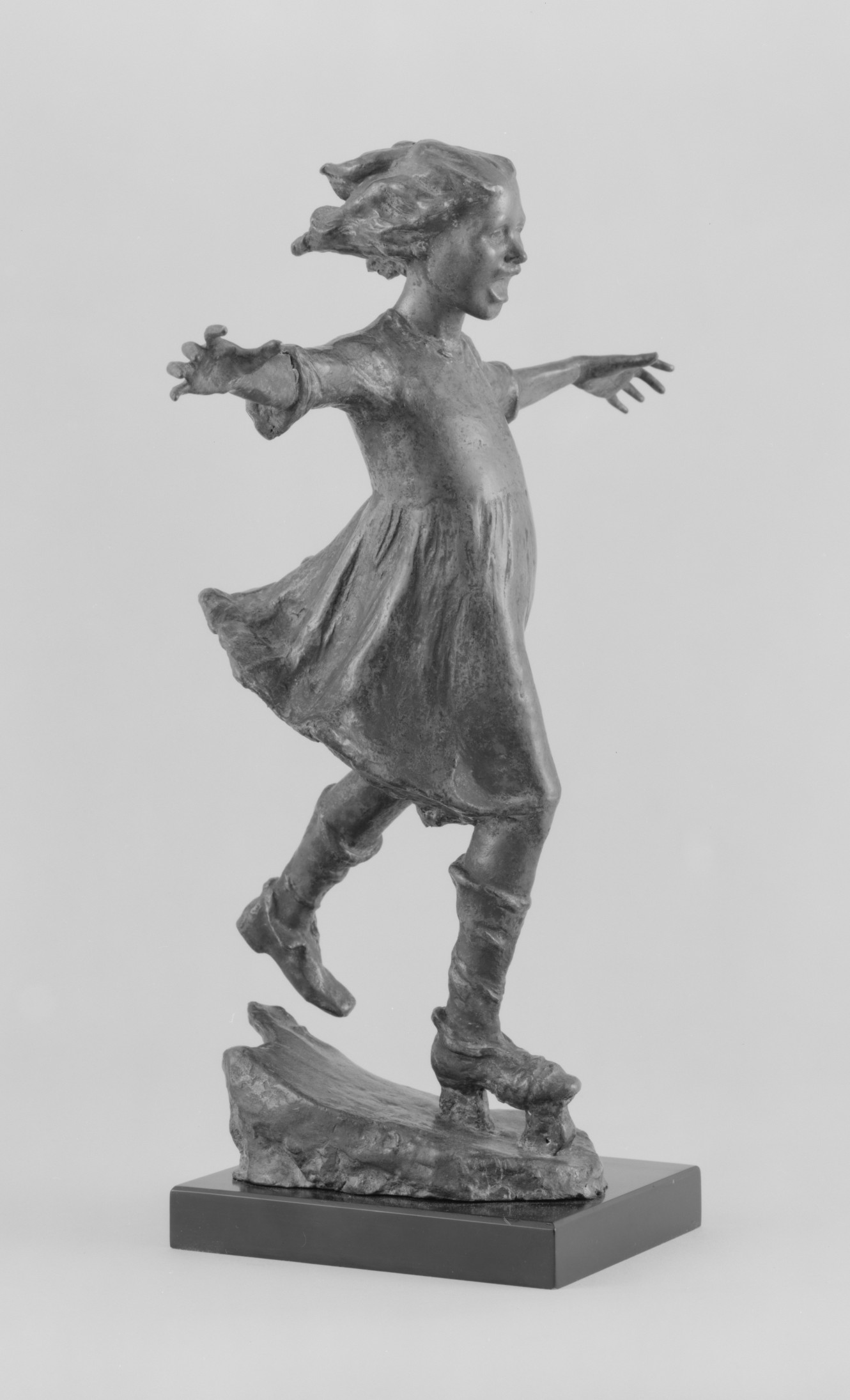
Girl Skating, 1907

Once Eberle had obtained the wax from her father's patient, she began copying tombstones and memorials in her community. This was the only type of sculpture available in Canton for her to study at that time. After a while, Eberle became so desperate to receive some art training that she took it upon herself to get other locals registered to fill spots when she learned that sculptor Frank Vogan would come to Canton, Ohio to teach a class. Eberle continued to study with Vogan for two years, which she said was very useful to her developments as an artist. In 1899, twenty-one-year-old Eberle would begin training under George Grey Barnard at the Art Students League in New York.

At some point in Eberle's early twenties, she went to visit her family in Puerto Rico, where her father had been relocated as a U.S. Army doctor. While in Puerto Rico, Eberle made small, quick clay sketches of everyday street subjects. Eberle's piece Puerto Rican Mother and Child (1901) was the first in which she expressed the everyday life of lower-class people. She received recognition as a young talent right away and received her tuition in scholarships and prizes. Eberle made such an impression on Barnard that eventually he left her in charge of the classroom when he could not make it to lead the class. She achieved early success with her sculpture Men and Bull, created in collaboration with Anna Hyatt Huntington, which was shown at the 1904 exhibition of the Society of American Artists. In 1906 Huntington and Eberle went their separate ways.

Huntington dedicated her work to animal sculptures and large monuments. Eberle, by contrast, worked on small bronzes dealing with social reform of lower-class immigrants. In 1907, Eberle completed Girl Skating (also known as Roller Skater, Girl with Roller Skate, or Roller Skating), an energetic clay sketch of a young lower-class girl roller-skating down the street. This was the first time she completed a study about the street life in New York. In 1906 she was elected to the National Sculpture Society. In 1920, she was elected to the National Academy of Design as an Associate Academician. St. Leger Eberle worked in a style related to Art Nouveau and the New Sculpture movement. She produced mainly portrait sculpture and decorative work for fountains.

== Later career ==
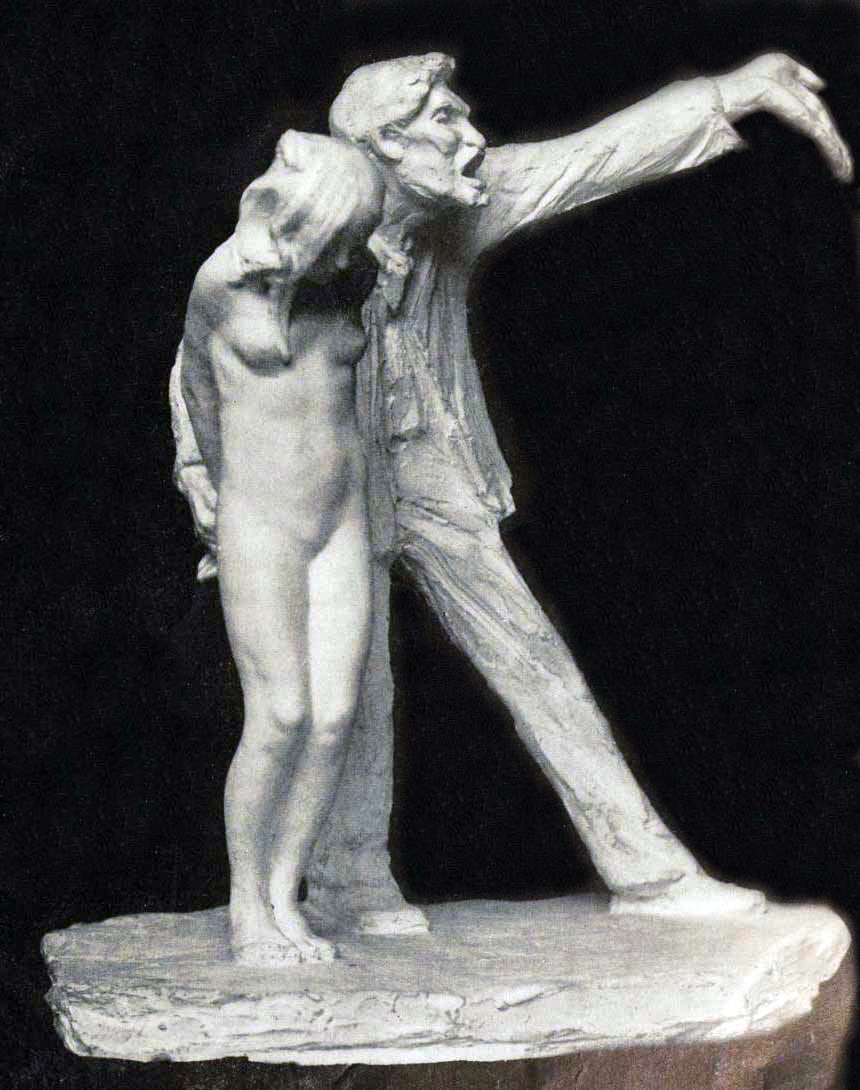
The White Slave, 1912–1913

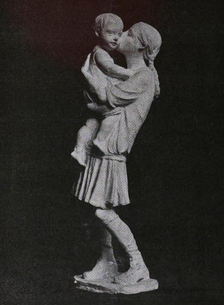
Her Only Brother, 1921

In May 1907, Eberle went to Naples, Italy, to oversee the casting process of her bronzes. Initially the foundry workmen were spiteful and jealous towards Eberle, finding it difficult to believe she had done them. Eventually they came around when they noticed Eberle's eye for detail and began taking her orders. When locals would look in the studio where Eberle's bronzes were being cast, locals would exclaim "Dio Mio" (meaning "my God") at a woman doing men's work. Eberle loved Neapolitan people and had good interest in the workmen and their families. When realizing that her men were sustaining themselves off only a hunk of bread all day, Eberle made sure they all had a substantial breakfast.

Her The White Slave was exhibited at the 1913 Armory Show in New York, and caused "a storm of violent controversy" because of its shocking combination of contemporary realism and the nude. The sculpture represented child prostitution, which at the time was euphemistically called white slavery. When Eberle returned from Italy, she said that she immersed herself "in the classic arts and was filled with the past." This was a pivotal point for Eberle coming in to her own as an artist.

Upon returning to New York, Eberle says, "When I landed in New York I began again to sense the modern spirit and to live in the present workaday world with all its commonplaces and yet with its idealism…I smelt the city's pungent odors and saw its children playing." That summer Eberle spent time as a settlement worker on the Lower East Side in order to "study the people there and the conditions under which they live, to be near them and to learn from them." She often used children in action on the playground as subjects in works like Bubbles (1908), a study of a young girl blowing soap bubbles. Soon Eberle moved her studio to Greenwich Village. At the time it was known for its immigrants of all backgrounds, low rent, and acceptance of a free lifestyle. Here Eberle created some of her most striking works.

Following this success she created a number of sculptures depicting working-class children from the Lower East Side, at play and work. These represented "the vitality of the city's immigrant population". Eberle explored similar themes of young immigrant children playing in other works such as Dance of the Ghetto Children (1914). Some of her works called for more political action, such as Ragpicker (1911) and Old Woman Picking Up Coal (1906). The latter depicts a poor Italian woman rummaging the streets for bits of coal to heat her stove.

Later in Eberle's career, she set up her studio right in New York's Lower East Side, after fearing her work was losing its proletarian character. She found a new place to work on the top floor of a tenement, and set up her studio with a playroom. Eberle used stories and toys to bring children to her studio, where she would work directly from them for her sculpture. In 1911 there was suffrage parade contingent of women sculptors, which Eberle took part in. Eberle's investment in the suffrage movement never ceased, though it took courage in the early 1900s. She was deeply influenced by the writings of Jane Addams, and she was also very committed to the feminist movement.

From 1907 until 1913, Eberle showed at Macbeth Gallery in Manhattan. Her work often did not pull in the money from collectors, and she sold bronze tobacco jars and bookends to get by.

Eberle was given an invitation to exhibit her work at the 1913 Armory Show, and she submitted Girls Wading (1913), a study of three girls at Coney Island Beach, and another sculpture titled White Slave (1913), which depicted a nude adolescent girl with arms pinned back being auctioned into prostitution. This work, in particular, generated a great deal of controversy when it was also printed on the cover of a magazine called Survey (a magazine devoted to social reform). Many readers felt that the cover was unfit to be seen in a decent home. The work White Slave is Eberle's response to newspaper stories describing the fate of low-income immigrant women forced into prostitution to survive. The woman in White Slave, with a thin and cold demeanor, is much different than the erotic nature of many other 19th figurative works. The work in all ways reveals Eberle's growing social awareness and fearlessness to create the work that was important to her.

By 1930 she had to leave New York because of financial and health problems. She settled in Westport, Connecticut.

Eberle submitted works to the mixed sculpturing category of the art competitions at the 1928 and 1932 Summer Olympics, but did not win a medal. Several of her sculptures are on display at the Kendall Young Library, in Webster City, Iowa, where she was born.

Eberle believed that art should have a social function, writing that artists "had no right to work as an individualist with no responsibility to others. [Artists] must see for people—reveal them to themselves and each other." Some of her work is in the collection of the Metropolitan Museum of Art. However, she is best known for figurative works that combined realism with emphasis on the flow of drapery and movement.

== Exhibitions ==
=== "Girl Skating" ===
- Smithsonian American Art Museum, 2011–Present.

=== "White Slave" ===
- Armory Show, A Turning Point, 1913, NYC
- Knoxville Museum of Art, American Women Artists: The 20th Century, Oct. 26, 1989–Feb. 4, 1990
- Queensboro Community College Art Gallery. March 11, 1990–Apr.5, 1990
- The Discovery Museum, Bridgeport, CT, They Earned Their Keep/ The Struggles and Successes of American Women Artists, Apr. 10, 1993 – May 30, 1993
- Parrish Art Museum, Southampton, NY Feb. 20, 1994–Apr. 10, 1994
- Los Angeles County Museum of Art, Figure in American Sculpture, Feb. 23, 1995 – May 14, 1995
- Montgomery Museum of Fine Arts, June 22, 1995–Sept. 10, 1995
- Wichita Art Museum, Oct. 19, 1995–Jan. 7, 1996
- National Academy of Design, Feb. 15, 1996 – May 5, 1996
- Whitney Museum of American Art, NYC: Part 1: The American Century Art and Culture, 1900–2000, Apr. 23, 1999–Aug. 22, 1999
- Museum of Sex, NYC Inaugural Exhibit: New York City Sex: How NY Transformed Sex in America, Sept. 2, 2003–Feb.15, 2004 Curator, Grady T. Turner,

== Bibliography ==
- Knoxville Museum of Art: "The 20th Century", Publisher: Elsa Honig Fine
- Louise R. Noun, "Abastenia St. Leger Eberle", 1980 Des Moines Art Center
- Barbara Haskell, "American Century", Art & Culture 1900–1950
- Melissa Dabakis, "Visualizing Labor in American Sculpture", in Monuments, Manliness, and the Work Ethic, 1880–1935, 1999
- Jane Scoular, The Subject of Prostitution: sex/work and social theory, Routledge, 2009
