= Louise Josephine Pope =

American painter

- Education: Wellesley College, New York School of Art, Robert Henri
- Spouse: Henri Hourtal

Louise Josephine Pope was an American painter. She studied at the New York School of Art, and then went abroad to study in Paris, Amsterdam and Madrid with Robert Henri. She exhibited work in the Salon d'Automne in Paris in 1912. In the United States, she exhibited at the National Academy of Design, the 1910 Exhibition of Independent Artists, the 1913 New York Armory Show, and the 1915 Exhibition of Painting and Sculpture by Women Artists for the Benefit of the Woman Suffrage Campaign, among others, contributing to the introduction of European Modernism to the United States.

== Education ==
Louise Josephine Pope, of New York City, attended Wellesley College from 1890 to 1894, graduating with her B.A. She went on to study at the New York School of Art, where Robert Henri was teaching. On June 15, 1907, Louise Pope and Kathleen McEnery led the list of awards for the school with Portrait class scholarships; Louise Pope received a Composition scholarship as well.

== Career ==
Pope reportedly moved to Paris with her mother, Josephine B. Pope, to study art, but exactly when is unclear. She may have traveled back and forth frequently between New York and Europe. In the 1908 American Art Annual, she is listed as living at 74 South Washington Square, New York. In the 1913 catalog, she is listed at 50 Washington Square, New York.

She attended Robert Henri's summer school in Madrid, Spain in 1906, as well as his summer school in Haarlem and Amsterdam in 1907. She was mentioned frequently in letters by Robert Henri and John Sloan, and apparently was considered a possible second wife for Robert Henri, whose first wife had died in 1905, and who remarried in 1908.

She exhibited her work at the Salon d'Automne in Paris in 1912. She also exhibited repeatedly in the United States. At the Winter exhibition of the National Academy of Design in 1906, she showed a Street Scene and a Park Scene. She was included in the 1910 Exhibition of Independent Artists. In the 1913 New York Armory Show, she displayed an oil painting, Portrait of Mrs. P. She exhibited in two group shows at the MacDowell Club in 1913, one in one in March–April, and one in October–November. In the October show she included four nude studies. She also exhibited in the 1915 Exhibition of Painting and Sculpture by Women Artists for the Benefit of the Woman Suffrage Campaign.

Stylistically, she explored the early modern painting styles of Futurism and Cubism. Not uncommonly for painters in the new styles, her work was heavily criticized. A review of a group show at the MacDowell Club in 1913 sniped: 'Louise Pope, who went to Paris, where she now is, a few years ago, a sane and healthy painter, has felt the lure of the "Futurists," and has not yet recovered. She shows four nude studies, presumably females.' At the Exhibition of Painting and Sculpture by Women Artists for the Benefit of the Woman Suffrage Campaign in 1915, her work was identified as "Cubist" and described as "incoherent and quite barbarous" and as depicting "prophecies of subway explosions."

== Marriage ==
Louise J. Pope was married to Henri Hourtal (1877–1944) of Paris, on December 30, 1916, in the Church of Saint-Sulpice, Paris. Hourtal, also a painter, was attached to the French army in Morocco and was later recognized for his paintings of Algeria.

Louise J. Pope has been incorrectly identified as the wife of Dr. Robert Ticehurst, but Dr. Ticehurst's obituary clearly identifies his wife as "Alice Louise Pope, R.N. (1914–2004)", born after the 1913 Armory Show. It is also easy to confuse Louise Josephine Pope with another Louise Pope who graduated from Wellesley College in 1892, later marrying Homer Johnson to become Louise Pope Johnson.
