= Margaret Hoard =

American painter

- Born: 1880; Washington, Iowa
- Died: 1944 (aged 63–64); Mount Vernon, New York
- Known for: Sculpture

Margaret Hoard (c. 1880–1944) American sculptor and painter born in Washington, Iowa. She studied in New York City at the Art Students League with Fraser and Aitken and painting with Arthur Wesley Dow.

Hoard was one of the artists who exhibited at the Armory Show of 1913, which included one of her sculptures, a plaster entitled Study of an old lady ($75).

Her marble carving, Eve is owned by the Metropolitan Museum of Art.

She was a member of the National Association of Women Painters and Sculptors.

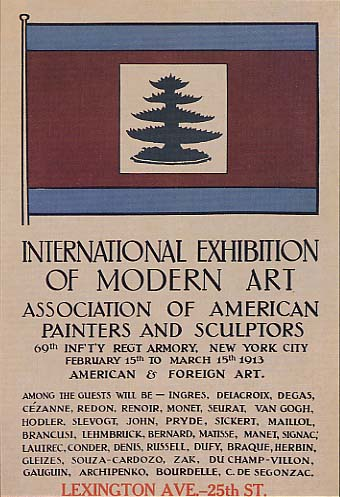
Armory Show poster
