= Myra Musselman-Carr =

American sculptor

- Born: November 27, 1871; Georgetown, Kentucky, US
- Died: 1929 (aged 57–58)
- Known for: Sculpture
- Spouse: Charles Bateman

Myra Musselman-Carr (November 27, 1871 – 1929) was an American sculptor born in Georgetown, Kentucky.

She studied first at the Art Academy of Cincinnati in Cincinnati, Ohio, then in New York City at the Art Students League and finally with Antoine Bourdelle in Paris. She is believed to have been an early proponent of the direct carving method of sculpting. Around 1915 to 1917 she founded the Modern Art School in New York and taught sculpture there, alongside co-founders and painting teachers Marguerite Zorach and William Zorach.

== Armory Show of 1913 ==
Musselman-Carr was one of the artists who exhibited at this important show which included two of her bronze statuettes entitled Electra ($50) and Indian grinding corn ($40).

Musselman-Carr was a member of the Woodstock Artists Association.
