= Edith Haworth =

American painter

Edith E. Haworth
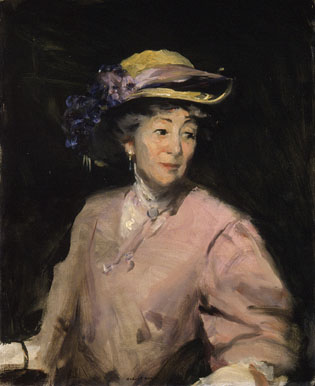
- Robert Henri, Portrait of Edith Haworth, 1909, Indiana University Art Museum
- Born: 1878 (Note: There are no records that substantiate either this year of birth or year of death. There was an Edith E. Haworth whose travel plans, residences and census records synch up to this artist. That Edith was born October 17, 1861 in Michigan and died in 1931 in New York. The portrait made by Henri may look more like someone aged 48 (born in 1861) than someone 31 years of age (born 1878). The Edith E. Haworth born in 1861 had a niece, Edith Kate Rathsbone, born in 1878 and the Rathsones and Haworth lived and traveled together for years. There are no reliable secondary sources found so far to clarify the dates.)
- Died: 1953
- Education: Shinnecock School of Art, New York School of Art; Studied in Europe
- Known for: Painting

Edith Haworth (1878–1953) was an American painter, who studied art in New York and showed her work in New York City and Detroit, Michigan, particularly at the Detroit Institute of Arts. In 1903 she was co-founder and treasurer of the Detroit Society of Women Painters.

== Education ==
Haworth studied under William Merritt Chase at the Shinnecock Hills Summer School of Art on Long Island, New York. She studied at the New York School of Art, now Parsons The New School for Design, which was founded by William Merritt Chase in 1896. Haworth had art instruction in Europe.

== Personal life ==
In 1897 she is listed as an artist, and she lived at the same address in 1898. In 1915 she was no longer living in Michigan, but continued to contribute to Michigan Artists exhibitions.

== Career ==
Miss Edith Haworth... is spontaneous. Her color lives and glows. It is joyous, rippling sunshine expressed with purest reds and yellows. Her composition is interesting as her color. She has the gift of painting a subject which we would have all passed by and investing it with great charm.

— The Arts, December 4, 1920

She was at the Detroit School of Art in 1900 and 1904. Three years later, she was a founding member and treasurer of the Detroit Society of Women Painters, which was formed to provide art instruction and broaden artistic opportunities for their members.

In April 1909 Robert Henri made a portrait of Haworth that is in the collection of the Indiana University Art Museum.

In Michigan, she exhibited at the Detroit Society of Women Painters and Sculptors, the Detroit Water Color Societies and "numerous times" between 1905 and 1924 at the Detroit Institute of Art. In New York, she exhibited in 1912 and 1914 at the MacDowell Club; the 1913 International Exhibition of Modern Art, including two watercolors, The village band and The birthday party; and at the 1914 National Arts Club exhibition of the Pastellists. She also exhibited there in 1919 at the Powell Galleries exhibition. Before 1911 she exhibited in Munich. She also exhibited at the Independent Artists Exhibitions.

During February 1931, Morton Galleries held a retrospective of her oil paintings since 1905. The following year her water colors were shown there in January.
