= Josephine Paddock =

American painter

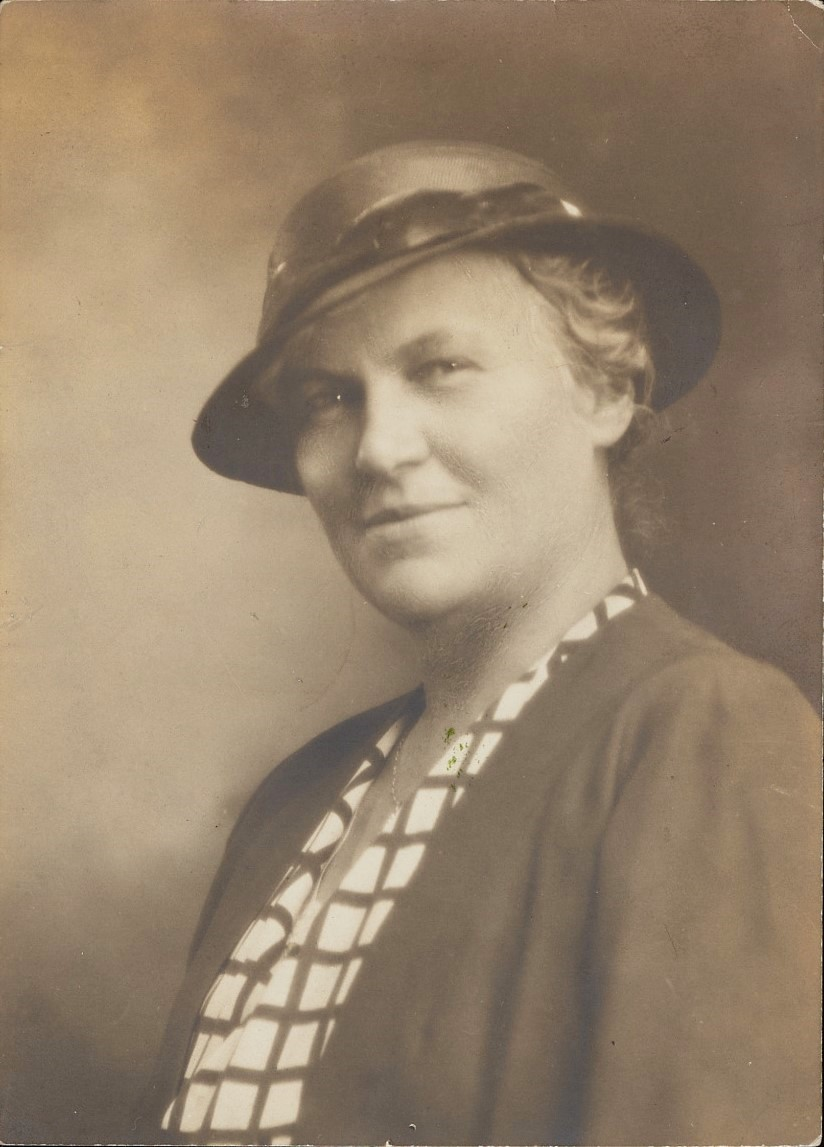
- Photo portrait of Paddock, taken before 1930
- Born: April 18, 1885; New York City
- Died: February 20, 1964 (aged 78); New York City
- Education: Barnard College; Art Students League
- Known for: Painting

Josephine Paddock (April 18, 1885 – February 20, 1964) was an American painter born in New York City. She earned a B.A. degree at Barnard College and studied at the Art Students League with Robert Henri, Kenyon Cox, William Merritt Chase, and John Alexander.

Her sister Ethel Louise Paddock was born two years later. She also studied with Henri and would also become a painter and a member of the National Association of Women Painters and Sculptors. Both sisters would go on to exhibit at Henri's Exhibition of Independent Artists in 1910, a show that in some ways was a prototype for the Armory Show three years later.

== Armory Show of 1913 ==
Paddock was one of the artists who exhibited at this landmark show. The show included three of her watercolors. These were: Swans on the grass ($50), Swan study-peace ($50), and Swan study-aspiration ($50).

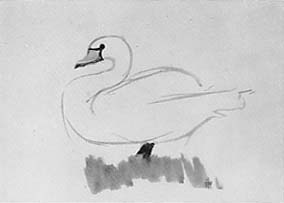
Swan on the Grass, 1910 (black & white reproductions)

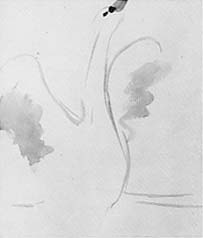
Swan Study - Aspiration, 1910

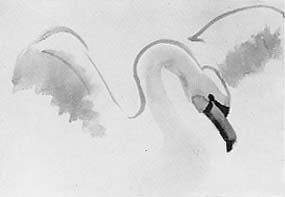
Swan Study - Peace, 1910

Her work was among forty-eight 19th and 20th Century paintings in the collection of Seymour R. Thaler and Mildred Thaler Cohen which was bequeathed to the Mattatuck Museum, Waterbury, Connecticut, in 2000.

Paddock was a member of the American Watercolor Society, Connecticut Academy of Fine Arts, New Haven Paint & Clay Club, Grand Central Art Gallery, NYC, North Shore Art Association, Gloucester, MA, American Artist Professional League.

The Josephine Paddock Fellowship is the highest award for graduate studies in the arts at Barnard College, Columbia University, in New York City.
