= Edith Woodman Burroughs =

American sculptor

- Born: Edith Woodman; 1871; New York, New York, U.S.
- Died: January 6, 1916 (aged 44–45); New York, New York, U.S.
- Known for: Sculpture
- Spouse: Bryson Burroughs (m. 1893)

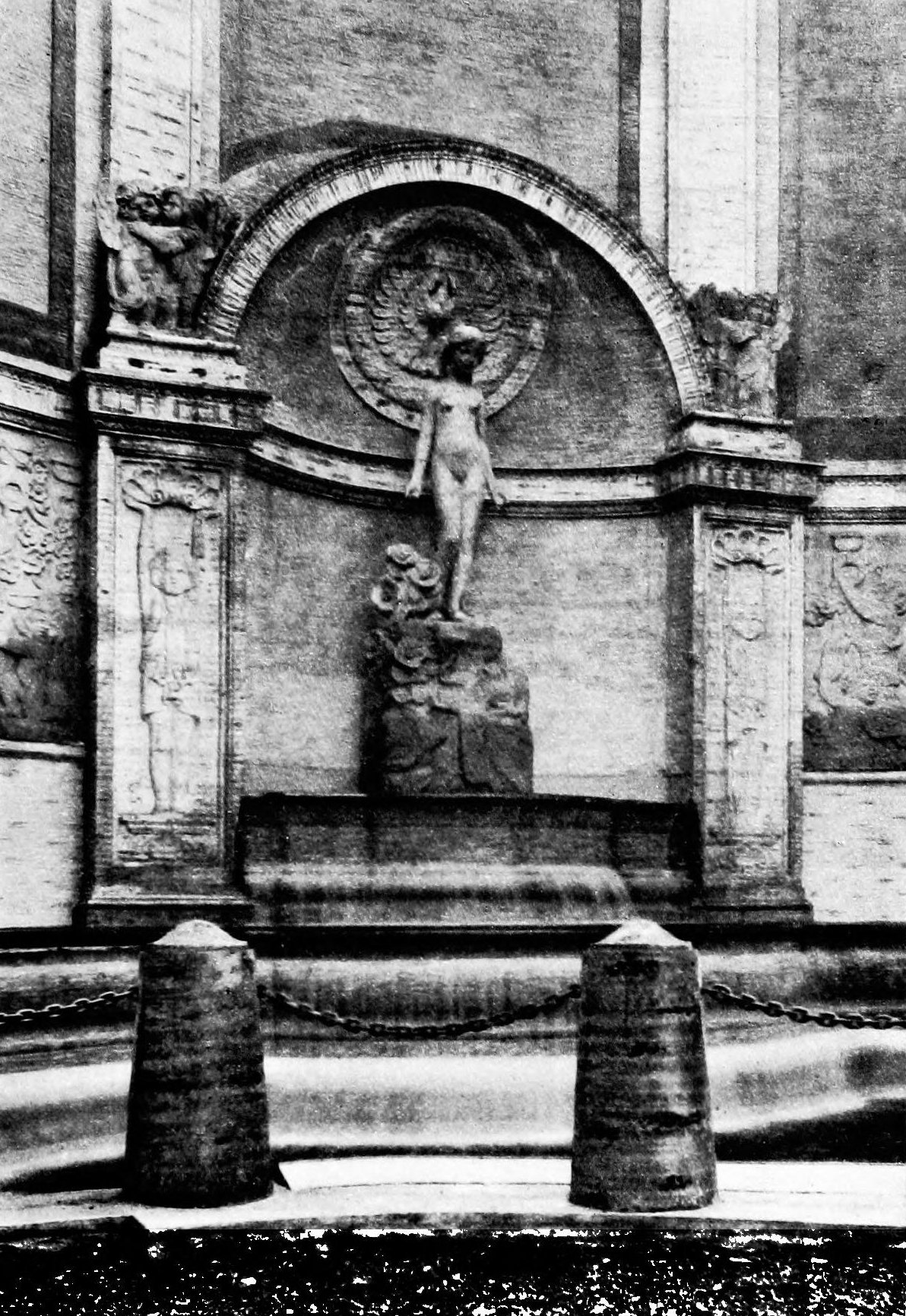
Fountain of Youth originally presented at the Panama–Pacific International Exposition (P.P.I.E.), held in San Francisco in 1915

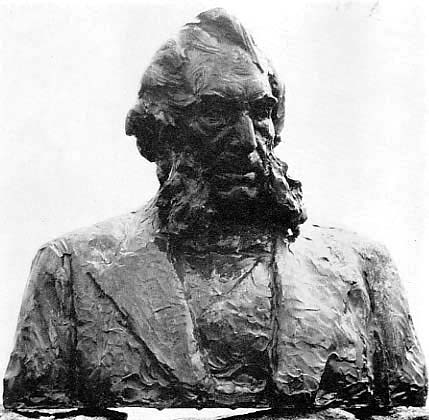
Portrait of John Bigelow, Armory Show, 1913

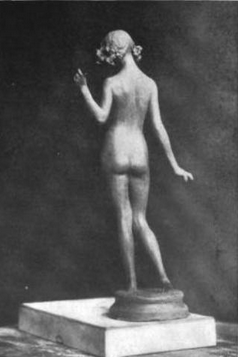
Nude

Edith Woodman Burroughs (1871 – January 6, 1916) was an American sculptor. Her work was included in the 1913 Armory Show.

== Biography ==
Born in Riverdale-on-Hudson, New York, Woodman began studying with master artists art at the early age of 15, working with Kenyon Cox and Augustus Saint Gaudens at the Art Students League. During Edith’s late teens, because of her upbeat personality she was able to stand out compared to another young female artists. This helped her create many different decorative figures for local churches, as well as teaching to aid with low-income art students.

After completing two years of working in workshops she was able to take a year break and educate herself about different styles of art. She went through northern France, ending up in Italy where she discovered Medieval Art.

In 1893 she married artist Bryson Burroughs, the future curator of paintings at the Metropolitan Museum of Art in New York City. She spent the next two years in Paris where she studied with Jean-Antoine Injalbert and Luc-Olivier Merson. In 1907 she won the Shaw Memorial Prize front the National Academy of Design for a work, Circe, that was subsequently shown at a major exhibit in Baltimore.

In 1909 she returned to Paris where she "came under the influence of Maillol", after which her work reflected his "simpler means of expression".

Woodman Burroughs designed two fountains for the 1915 Panama–Pacific International Exposition in San Francisco. Her Fountain of Youth figure was described as personifying innocence and purity.

Burroughs exhibited a bronze bust, Portrait of John Bigelow at the 1913 Armory Show in New York. In 1913, she was elected into the National Academy of Design as an Associate member.

Burroughs has four pieces in the Metropolitan Museum of Art collection from her early 20th century work: her 1908 John La Farge, 1909 Grolier Club Memorial of Edgar Allan Poe, 1911 Roger Fry, which was attributed by the Metropolitan for showcasing her skills in expressive surface modeling, as well as her 1912 At the Threshold.

She died in Flushing, New York, on January 6, 1916.

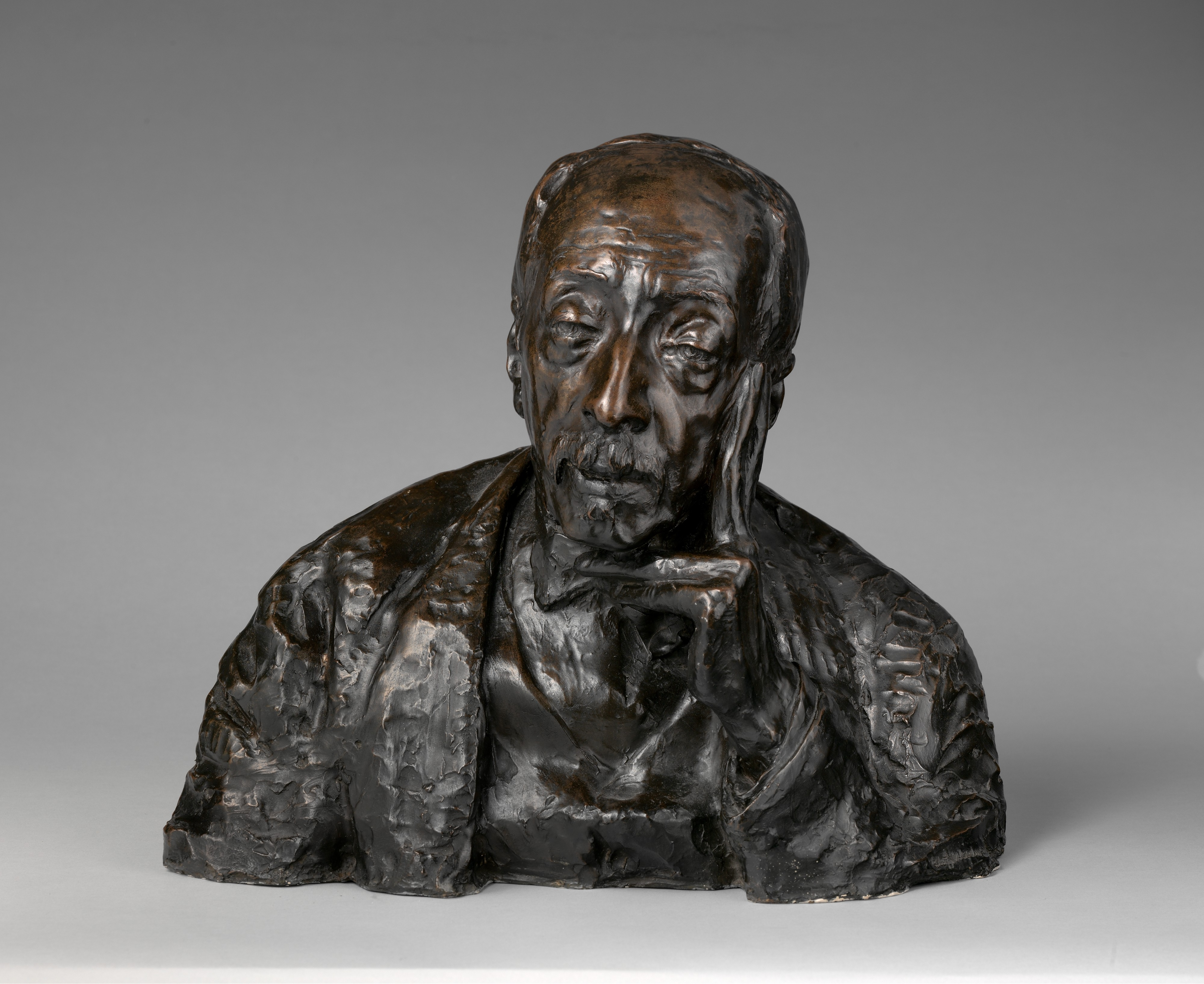
John La Farge, bronze sculpture, 1908, Metropolitan Museum of Art

== Her work ==
Her work can be found in numerous museums and galleries including:

- Oakland Museum, Oakland, California
- R.W. Norton Art Gallery, Shreveport, Louisiana
- Newark Museum, Newark, New Jersey
- Metropolitan Museum of Art, New York City
- Brookgreen Gardens, Murrells Inlet, South Carolina
- Corcoran Gallery of Art, Washington, D.C.
- Yale University, New Haven, Connecticut
- Hearst San Simeon State Historical Monument, San Simeon, California
- Rhode Island School of Design, Providence, Rhode Island

== See also ==
- List of artists in the Armory Show
