= Carolyn Mase =

American painter

Carolyn Campbell Mase
- Born: 1880; Matteawan, New York
- Died: 1949 (aged 68–69)
- Known for: Painting

Carolyn Campbell Mase (1880–1949) was an American painter, best known for her Impressionist landscapes.

== Life ==
She studied painting with John Henry Twachtman. She had developed into a well established artist by 1912.

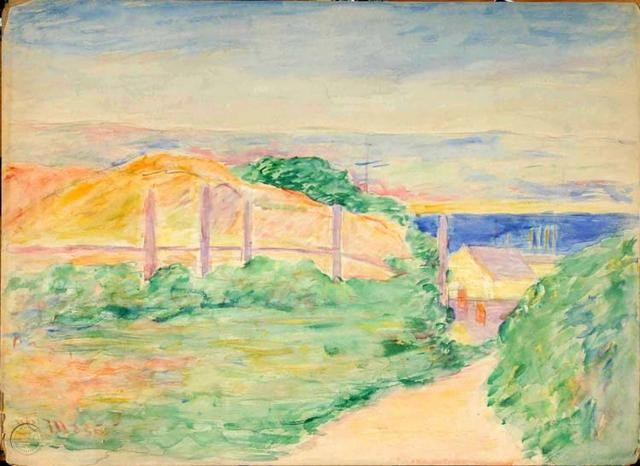
Harbor scene

She was born in Matteawan, New York, and was raised in Beacon, New York, where the fire station is named after her father, Willard H. Mase. After finishing school in Beacon, Ms. Mase and her friend and contemporary, Alice Judson, traveled to France to study painting where they were influenced by the Impressionists of the day: Renoir, Manet and Monet. "Ms. Mase's style lent itself well to the subject matter of the Hudson River and its Highlands... radically changing the images from the precise Hudson River School technique to the softer impressionism then gaining influence abroad."

=== Armory Show of 1913 ===
Mase was one of the artists who exhibited at the Armory Show of 1913, which included one of her pastels entitled September Haze. The piece was priced at $100, the equivalent of $3,038.79 in 2024.

== Reception ==
On May 1, 1929, Vassar Quarterly labeled her art as "delicate color and impressionistic technique".
