= Kathleen McEnery =

American painter

Kathleen McEnery Cunningham
- Born: 1885; Brooklyn, New York
- Died: 1971 (aged 85–86); Rochester, New York
- Education: Pratt Institute, Robert Henri's class in Spain, Paris
- Known for: Painting
- Movement: Modernism
- Spouse: Frank Cunningham

Kathleen McEnery Cunningham (1885–1971) was an American painter.

== Education ==
McEnery was born in 1885 in Brooklyn, New York. She studied at a Belgian convent for one year before returning to New York to study at the Pratt Institute. She then studied under Robert Henri, traveling with his class to Spain in 1906–8 and then continuing her studies for two more years in Paris.

== Work ==
McEnery opened her own studio in New York, where she painted many portraits and still-lives, following the school of Modernism. Her work was shown alongside that of Stuart Davis, Robert Henri, George Bellows, and Edward Hopper. She exhibited two nudes in the Armory Show in 1913.

After she married Frank Cunningham and moved to Rochester, New York, she continued to paint and exhibit under her maiden name. Her work was shown in the MacDowell Club as well as a suffrage show in 1915, a Society of Independent Artists show in 1920 and 1922, and other exhibitions at the Ferargil Galleries.

McEnery was an influential artist in Rochester. She was a member of the board of the Memorial Art Gallery, where she also taught classes for many years. She died in Rochester in 1971.
