= Florence Dreyfous =

American painter (1868–1950)

- Born: October 25, 1868; New York
- Died: September 11, 1950 (aged 81)
- Resting place: Beth Olom Cemetery (also known as Shearith Israel Cemetery), Queens, New York
- Known for: Sculpture

Florence Dreyfous (October 25, 1868 – September 11, 1950) was an American painter who studied and spent most of her life in New York City.

== Early life and education ==
Florence Dreyfous was born in New York City on October 25, 1868 to Alida Gomez Dreyfous (1833–1907) and her husband Joseph A. Dreyfous (1832–1891), both of Sephardic Jewish ancestry. The family would also include daughters—Adele (1859–1879) and Gertrude (1862–1949)—and son Walter (1861–1924). Through their mother, the family would become involved in litigation against a distant relative, Horatio Gomez, who administered a family estate beginning in 1865, but never gave other family members and accounting and also entered into various below-market long-term leases, so a court appointed a referee to investigate his administration in 1891.

Dreyfous studied at the Chase School of Art and with Robert Henri at the Henri School of Art, as well as with contemporary miniaturist Theodora W. Thayer(1868–1905).

== Career ==
In 1903 and 1904, Dreyfous exhibited at the Pennsylvania Academy of the Fine Arts. She also exhibited two of her watercolors, A boy and Mildred, at the landmark 1913 International Exhibition of Modern Art. Between 1916 and 1932, Dreyfous exhibited at the MacDowell Club, Society of Independent Artists, Morton Gallery in New York, Salons of America and the Opportunity Gallery, all in New York. In November and December 1921, a watercolor exhibition at the Brooklyn Museum of Art also included her work.

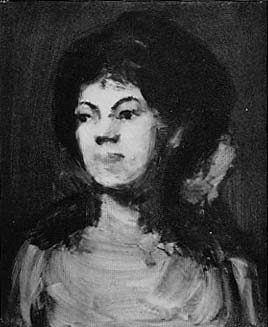
Florence Dreyfous - Mildred - Armory Show 1913

== Death ==
Dreyfous died September 11, 1950, and is buried with her parents and siblings at historic Beth Olom cemetery in Queens County, New York.
