= Bessie Marsh Brewer =

Canadian printmaker, painter, sculptor and teacher (1884–1952)

- Born: 1884; Toronto, Ontario, Canada
- Died: 1952 (aged 67–68); New York City, United States
- Known for: Painter, Printmaker

Bessie Marsh Brewer (1884–1952) was a Canadian-American printmaker, painter, sculptor and teacher. She studied at the New York School of Applied Design for Women and at the Art Students League with Robert Henri and John Sloan. She illustrated for Century, Phoenix, Collier's, and St. Nicholas magazines.

She exhibited at the 1913 New York Armory Show where she showed three drawings, The Furnished Room, Curiosity and Putting Her Monday Name on Her Letterbox. Amongst the aforementioned skills, Bessie Marsh Brewer created in the styles of Realism, Representation, and Naturalism.

She was the mother of Sam Pope Brewer, New York Times correspondent whose wife later remarried to Kim Philby.

== Awards ==
New York School of Applied Design for Women in commercial art (1922).

== See also ==
List of artists in the Armory Show
