= May Wilson Preston =

American artist (1873–1949)

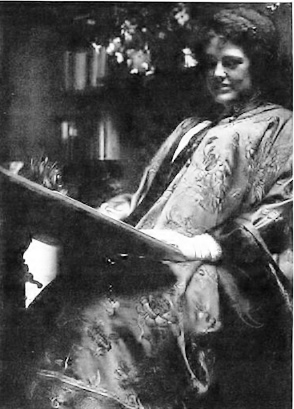
- Abastenia St. Leger Eberle, May Wilson Preston, by 1910
- Born: May Wilson; August 11, 1873; New York, New York
- Died: May 18, 1949 (aged 75); East Hampton, New York
- Education: Art Students League of New York, James Abbott McNeill Whistler, William Merritt Chase
- Known for: Illustrations
- Spouses: Thomas Henry Watkins (1898-his death); James Moore Preston (1903-1949), her death

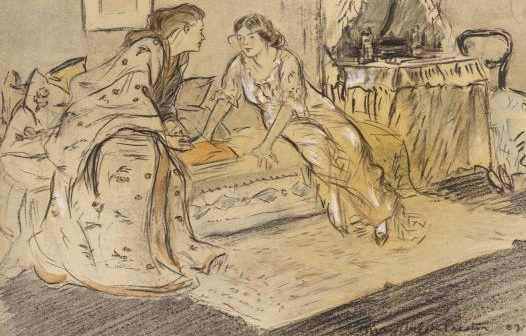
May Wilson Preston, The Confidantes, 1907, Barnes Foundation

Mary (May) Wilson Watkins Preston (August 11, 1873 – May 18, 1949) was an American illustrator of books and magazines and an impressionist painter. She had an interest in art beginning in her teenage years, but her parents sent her to Oberlin College hoping that she would develop another interest. After three years, and at the urging of one of her teachers, Preston's parents allowed her to return to New York and attend the Art Students League. She then studied in Paris with James Whistler and next at the New York School of Art with William Merritt Chase.

Following the death of her first husband, Thomas Henry Watkins, Preston embarked on a career as an illustrator to support herself. She socialized and exhibited with artists of the Ashcan School and married one of the group, James Moore Preston, in 1903. They traveled to Europe together, summered on Long Island, and co-illustrated a magazine story. She became a successful illustrator for magazines, such as Harper's Bazaar and The Saturday Evening Post, and was a successful book illustrator. Considered one of the top women illustrators between 1900 and 1940, Preston was one of the few female members and exhibitors of the Society of Illustrators, having been admitted March 29, 1904, after peers Florence Scovel Shinn, Elizabeth Shippen Green, Violet Oakley, and Jessie Willcox Smith. Like them, she was only an Associate Member since full membership was not allowed for women until the 1920s. She exhibited at the 1913 Armory Show and won a medal at the Panama–Pacific Exposition in 1915. Preston was one of the major suffrage artists. Her works are in a number of museum collections. She played herself a chapter of the film serial Our Mutual Girl that was shown in theaters in 1915.

== Early life ==
Mary Wilson was born on August 28, 1873, in New York City. She was the only child of Ann Taylor Wilson and John J. Wilson. Preston was one of the founders of the country's oldest women's fine arts organization, the Women's Art Club, at the age of 16.

== Education ==
She was a "high spirited girl" whose parents tried to dissuade her from becoming and artist and sent her to Oberlin College in 1889. Preston was there until 1892, when one of her teachers convinced her parents to allow their "irrepressible" daughter to study art. She studied at the Art Students League of New York from 1892 through 1897 under William Merritt Chase, Robert Henri and John Henry Twachtman. She objected when, as a female, she was not allowed to attend life drawing classes. Preston studied in Paris with James Whistler.

She studied under Chase again at the New York School of Art in 1901. She met Edith Dimock and another art student, Lou Seyme there. After the three moved into the Sherwood Studios on 57th Street, they became known as the "Sherwood Sisters" for the weekly open house they held at their studio, noted for its "fun and high jinks".

== Marriage ==
In 1898 she married Thomas Henry Watkins, who died in 1900. In 1903 May Wilson Watkins married artist James Moore Preston, who was one of the artists in the urban realism group called the Ashcan School with George Luks, Everett Shinn, John Sloan, and Robert Henri. Her roommate Dimock married one of the original Ashcan School painters, William J. Glackens. The two couples spent summers together from 1911 to 1917 in Bellport on Long Island and took trips together to Europe. May and James traveled to France often. In New York, they frequented Cafe Francis and Mouquin's with a group of fellow artists. In 1935, the Prestons moved to East Hampton, New York. The Prestons did not have any children.

== Career ==
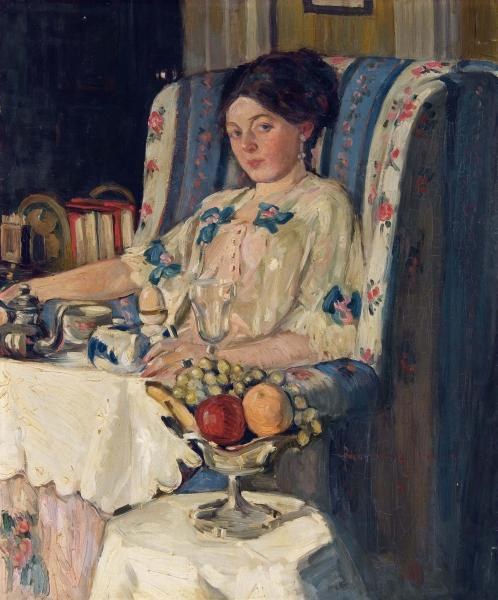
May Wilson Preston, Dejeuner, circa 1910, oil on canvas, Barnes Foundation

After her first husband's death, she supported herself by working as an illustrator. Unsure of her talent, she approached a magazine with trepidation. When asked by the editor why she brought her drawings to them, Preston said, "Because, I am a beginner and thought that this was the worst magazine I had ever seen." He bought a sketch, with a smile on his face. Preston began illustrating in 1900 and the following year her works were published in Harper's Bazaar.

From "People who interest us: May Wilson Preston, Illustrator of Real Life" in The Craftsman (1910):

[S]he lived courageously through years of repeated defeat, experiencing every variety of supercilious rebuff that tradition can offer fresh creative effort ... her determination to stick to her ideals has been as great as her courage.

At the turn of the century there was a movement to incorporate greater realism in illustrations. Preston was one of the artists who effectively followed the lead of William Glackens, George Luks and Everett Shinn. She was considered one of the top woman illustrators between 1900 and 1939. Others were Elizabeth Shippen Green, Jessie Willcox Smith, and Violet Oakley. Preston became the first, and for years the only, woman to be an associate member and exhibitor at the Society of Illustrators. In 1920, the four top women illustrators and society's associate members became full members when the Society of Illustrators was incorporated. Preston also showed her work with the artists of the informal Ashcan School.

She was one of the major suffrage artists, as were Nina E. Allender and Rose O'Neill. Preston was one of the postcard artists for the movement. From 1902 to 1915, it was a pastime of many Americans to collect postcards. She was a judge to select artwork for 300 billboard across the state of New York. John French Sloan and F. Luis Mora were the other judges.

Preston was a co-illustrator with her husband, James Moore Preston, on the "Our Horse" story printed in a 1910 edition of Everybody's Magazine. The landmark Armory Show of 1913 included one of Preston's oil paintings, Girl with print. She won an award at the Panama–Pacific Exposition in 1915. In New York, she exhibited at the MacDowell Club. Preston played herself in the movie Our Mutual Girl which was shown in theaters in 1915.

In 1920, Preston illustrated two F. Scott Fitzgerald stories for The Saturday Evening Post: Bernice Bobs Her Hair and Myra Meets His Family. She also illustrated stories published in the Post by Mary Roberts Rinehart. Her drawings illustrated articles by Ring Lardner and P. G. Wodehouse.

== Later years ==
Her career was essentially over after contracting a skin infection that made it difficult for her to paint and as a result of the dwindling market during the Depression. She died on May 18, 1949, in East Hampton on Long Island, New York. Her husband, James Moore Preston, died in 1962.

== Collections ==
- Barnes Foundation, Pennsylvania
- Brandywine River Museum, Chadds Ford, Pennsylvania
- Delaware Art Museum, Wilmington
- Free Library of Philadelphia, Logan Square, Philadelphia, Pennsylvania
- Library of Congress, Division of Prints & Photographs, Washington D.C.
- Museum of Art Fort Lauderdale, Florida
- National Museum of American History, Smithsonian Institution, Washington, D.C.
- National Portrait Gallery, Smithsonian Institution, Washington, D.C.
- New Britain Museum of American Art, Connecticut

== Works ==
Illustrated books

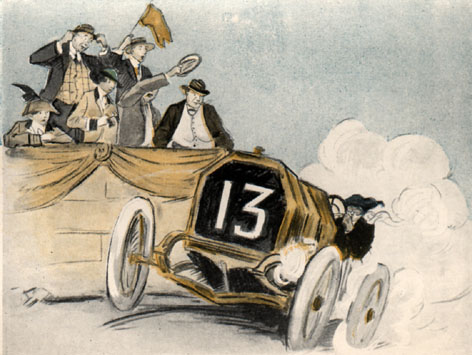
May Wilson Preston, "Without cutting down her speed, bumped home the winner", Illustration for Tish, Mind over Motor, 1916

The following is a short list of 41 books at the Library of Congress for Preston:

- Ellis Parker Butler (1908). The Cheerful Smugglers. Illustrations by May Wilson Preston. New York: Century Company. LCCN 08011086.
- Alice Woods Ullman (1912). Fame-seekers. Illustrations by May Wilson Preston. New York: George H. Doran Company. LCCN 12008667.
- Margaret Cameron (Dramatist) (1913). The Golden Rule Dollivers. Illustrations by May Wilson Preston. Harper & Bros.
- Him (1915). How it Feels to be the Husband of a Suffragette Illustrations by May Wilson Preston. New York : George H. Doran Company. LCCN 15015726.
- Mary Roberts Rinehart (1916). Tish. Illustrations by May Wilson Preston. New York: A. L. Burt. LCCN 19011339.
- Mary Roberts Rinehart (1917). Bab, A Sub-Deb. Illustrations by May Wilson Preston. New York: George H. Doran Company.
- Katherine Haviland Taylor (1917). Cecelia of the Pink Roses. Illustrated by May Wilson Preston. New York: George H. Doran Company. LCCN 17013951.
- Ring W. Lardner (1917). Gullible's Travels, etc. Illustrated by May Wilson Preston. Indianapolis: The Bobbs-Merrill Company. LCCN 17005401.
- Pelham Grenville Wodehouse (1917). Piccadilly Jim. Illustrations by May Wilson Preston. Grosset & Dunlap.
- Wallace Irwin (1918). Venus in the East. Illustrated by May Wilson Preston. New York: George H. Doran Company. LCCN 18022249.
- Wallace Irwin (1919). The Blooming Angel. Illustrations by May Wilson Preston. New York: George H. Doran. LCCN 19011941.
- Frances Roberta Sterrett (1919). Jimmie the Sixth. Illustrated by May Wilson Preston. New York; London: D. Appleton and Company. LCCN 18020479.
- Ring Wilmer Lardner (June 2013). The Real Dope. Illustrations by May Wilson Preston and M. L. Blumenthal. HardPress. ISBN 978-1-314-39159-6.
