= James Moore Preston =

American painter (1873–1962)

James Moore Preston (1873–1962) was an American painter and illustrator, married to fellow artist May Wilson Preston. He was one of the Ashcan School, along with his friend, William Glackens.

== Early life ==
James Moore Preston was born in Roxborough, Pennsylvania in 1873.

== Education ==
During the 1890s, Preston studied at the Pennsylvania Academy of the Fine Arts in Philadelphia, where he met Robert Henri and George Luks. Fellow students were William Glackens and Everett Shinn. After working for a Philadelphia newspaper, Preston studied at the Académie Colarossi in Paris in 1898. American artist May Wilson was also studying in Paris at that time.

== Marriage ==
In 1903 Preston married May Wilson, whose roommate Edith Dimock married one of Preston's friend, William J. Glackens. The two couples spent summers together from 1911 to 1917 in Bellport on Long Island and took trips together to Europe. May and James traveled to France often. In New York, they frequented Cafe Francis and Mouquin's with a group of fellow artists. In 1935, the Prestons moved to East Hampton, New York.

== Career ==
Preston worked for the Philadelphia newspaper as an artist-reporter in 1895. He shared a studio at that time with John Sloan. After Paris, Preston moved to New York by 1900 and joined Luks, Glackens, and Wilson. He was a landscape painter and a member of the group called The Eight that included friends from New York and Philadelphia. He was one of the artists in the urban realism group called the Ashcan School with George Luks, Everett Shinn, John Sloan, and Robert Henri.

Preston was a co-illustrator with his wife, May Wilson Preston, on the "Our Horse" story printed in a 1910 edition of Everybody's Magazine. He exhibited in 1913 at the Armory Show and in the 1910s at the Pennsylvania Academy of the Fine Arts. In New York, he exhibited at the MacDowell Club. He became a successful illustrator in the 1920s; he created images for advertisements and magazines. He focused on painting after he moved to East Hampton with his wife in 1935.
