= Edith Dimock =

American painter (1876–1955)

Edith Dimock Glackens
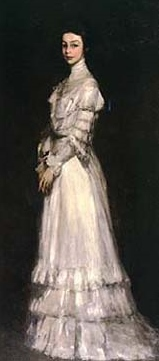
- Robert Henri, Portrait of Edith Dimock Glackens, ca. 1902–4, Sheldon Museum of Art
- Born: Edith Dimock; February 16, 1876; Hartford, Connecticut
- Died: October 28, 1955 (aged 79)
- Education: Art Students League, William Merritt Chase
- Spouse: William Glackens

Edith Dimock (February 16, 1876 – October 28, 1955) was an American painter. Her work was exhibited at the 1913 Armory Show in New York. She married fellow artist, William Glackens, but continued to use her maiden name professionally after the marriage.

== Personal life ==
Dimock was born in 1876 in Hartford, Connecticut. She was given the nickname of "Teed", and was the daughter of Ira Dimock, a silk merchant based in Connecticut, and older sister of Stanley, Harold Edwin and Florence Irene Dimock (1889–1962). Dimock developed an interest in art in her childhood and began her education in art in New York in her 20s against the wishes of her parents. On February 16, 1904, she married painter William Glackens in her family's Vanderbilt Hill mansion, originally built for Cornelius Vanderbilt.

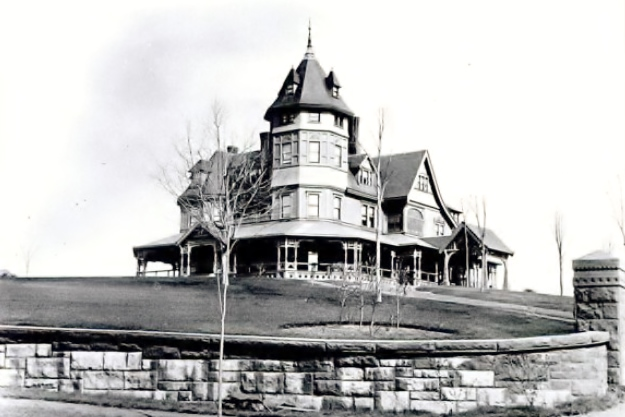
Ira Dimock's house on Vanderbilt Hill, Hartford, Connecticut where Edith Dimock was raised and married (built in 1879, razed in 1920)

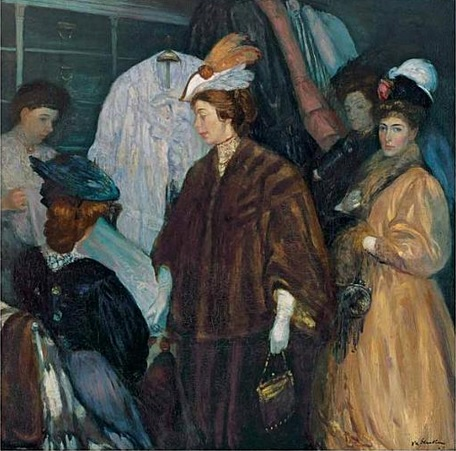
William Glackens, The Shoppers (1907–8; Chrysler Museum of Art, Norfolk, Virginia). The central figure is Edith Dimock.

As a wedding present, Robert Henri painted portraits of the bride and groom. Edith's portrait was started in 1902. In it, she was described as "still a demure socialite from Hartford" by author Bennard Perlman. Until they could find a larger place, they first lived in a one-room apartment in the Sherman Building in New York City. They then lived at 3 Washington Square North. Following the marriage, "she devoted her time and energies to her family." Their son Ira, born in 1907, was a writer who wrote two books about his father. In 1913 Dimock gave birth to their daughter, Lenna, an artist. Lenna and Edith were favored models for William Glackens. From 1911 to 1917, Dimock and her family spent the summers at Belport on Long Island, where her husband, William Glackens, painted beach scenes. Artists and good friends May Preston and James Moore Preston often spent the summers there and traveled with the Glackens to Europe.

Dimock was an honorary secretary of the National Union of Women's Suffrage Societies in 1911 and 1915. In 1913 she marched in the large suffrage parade in New York, along with a group of other artists.

Her husband died in 1938. Dimock died October 28, 1955, at her home in Hartford.

== Career ==
She studied at the Art Students League between 1895 and 1899 with William Merritt Chase. Dimock described her classes at the Art Students League:

In a room innocent of ventilation, the job was to draw Venus (just the head) and her colleagues. We were not allowed to hitch bodies to the heads——yet. The dead white plaster of Paris was a perfect inducer of eye-strain, and was called "The Antique." One was supposed to work from "The Antique" for two years. The advantage of "The Antique" was that all these gods and athletes were such excellent models: there never was the twitch of an iron-bound muscle. Venus never batted her hard-boiled egg eye, and the Discus-thrower never wearied. They were also cheap models and did not have to be paid union rates.

— Edith Dimock

She then studied with Chase at the New York School of Art. She shared a studio in the Sherwood Building, and artist's cooperative building on 57th Street in Manhattan, with May Preston and another artist. The three women held weekly open houses and became known as the lively "Sherwood Sisters". The women gathered with male artists from the Ashcan School, including William Glackens and James Moore Preston, at Mouquin's and Cafe Francis. Following her marriage in 1904, Dimock continued to sign her works using her maiden name.

In 1904 her works were shown at the American Water Color Society exhibition:

Miss Dimock is not unorthodox at all. She comes to her world very unconventionally, free from pictorial prejudice, and with a purpose which is not complicated by unsettled notions. Her attitude to life is the precise antithesis of the attitude that prevails in this exhibition, where unattached sentiment rules and the 'picture instinct' is so much too strong for original observation. Here is an artist with a definite aim, a keen fresh vision.

— Evening Star review

She made watercolor genre scenes "though charming, often displayed a caustic sense of humor."

She illustrated Grace Van Rensselaer Dwight's children's book of nine short stories, The yellow cat and her friends which was published in 1905 and Kate Forrest Oswell's Stories Grandmother Told, which was published in 1912.

Her works were shown in 1908 with seven other painters at the Macbeth Galleries at the Ashcan School. Dimock exhibited at the New York Armory Show of 1913, where she showed 8 works, Sweat Shop Girls in the Country, Mother and Daughter, and six paintings, all entitled Group.

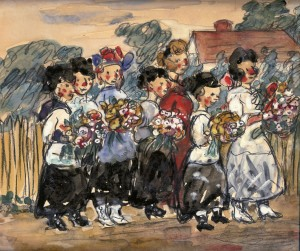
Sweat Shop Girls in the Country, c. 1913. Watercolor, gouache, and charcoal on paper

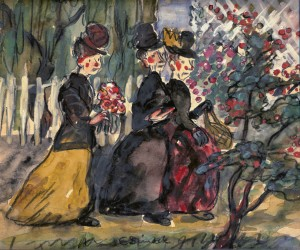
Three Women, c. 1913. Watercolor, gouache, and charcoal on paper

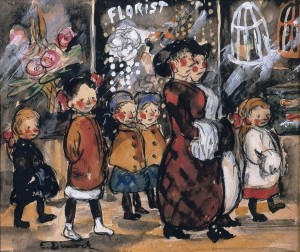
Florist, c. 1913. Watercolor, gouache, and charcoal on paper

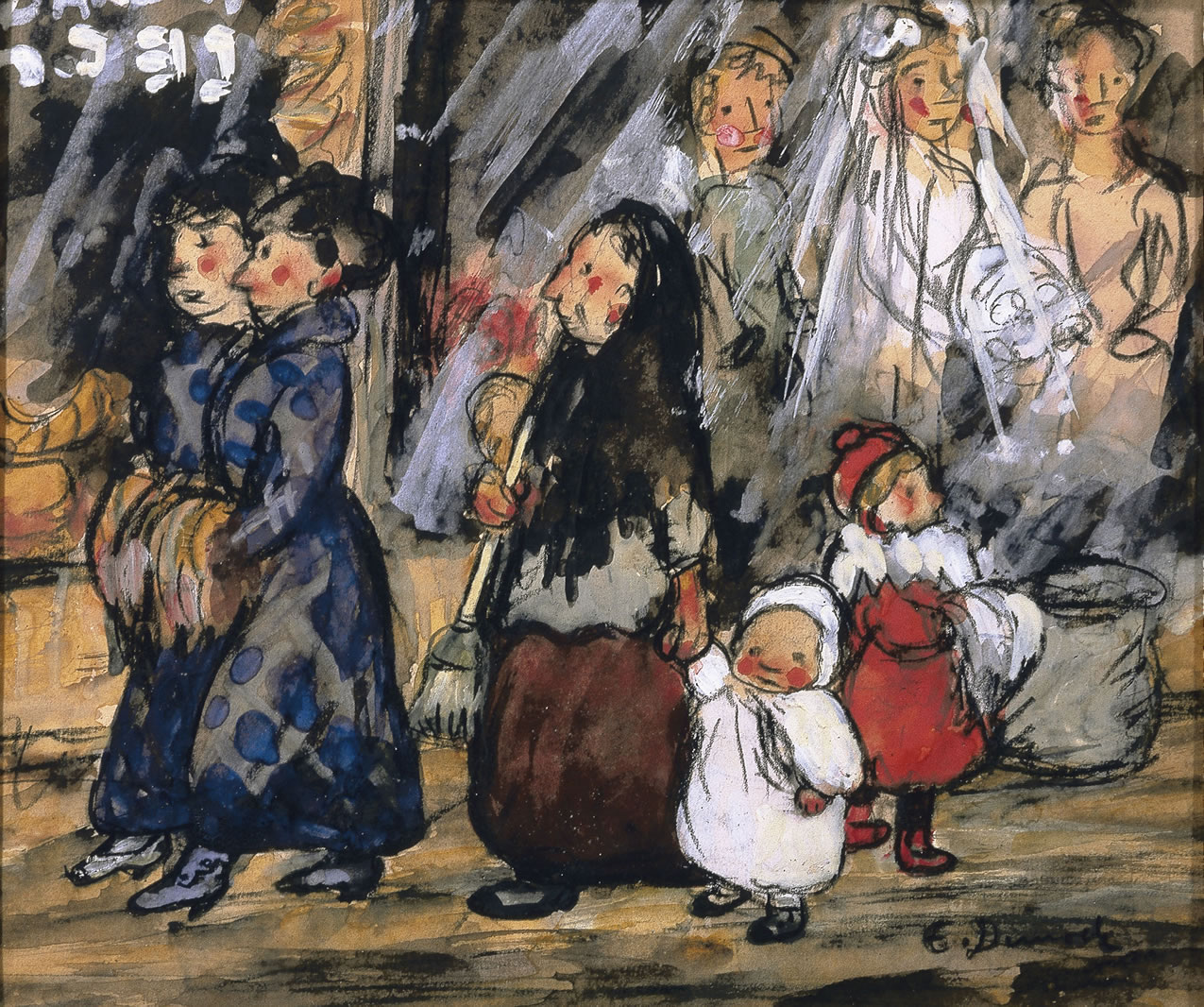
Bridal Shop, c. 1913, watercolor, gouache, and charcoal on paper

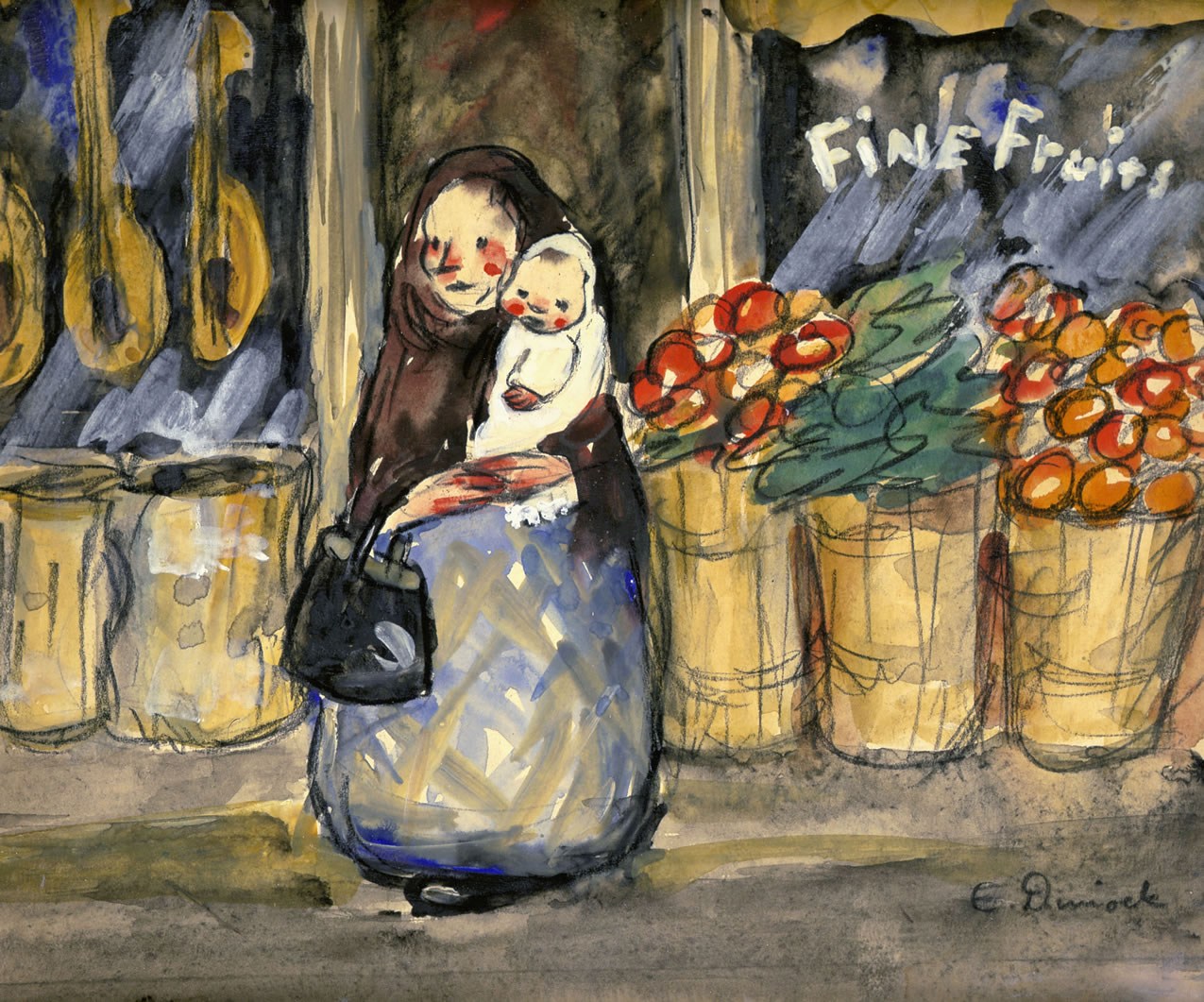
Fine Fruits, c. 1913, watercolor, gouache, and charcoal on paper

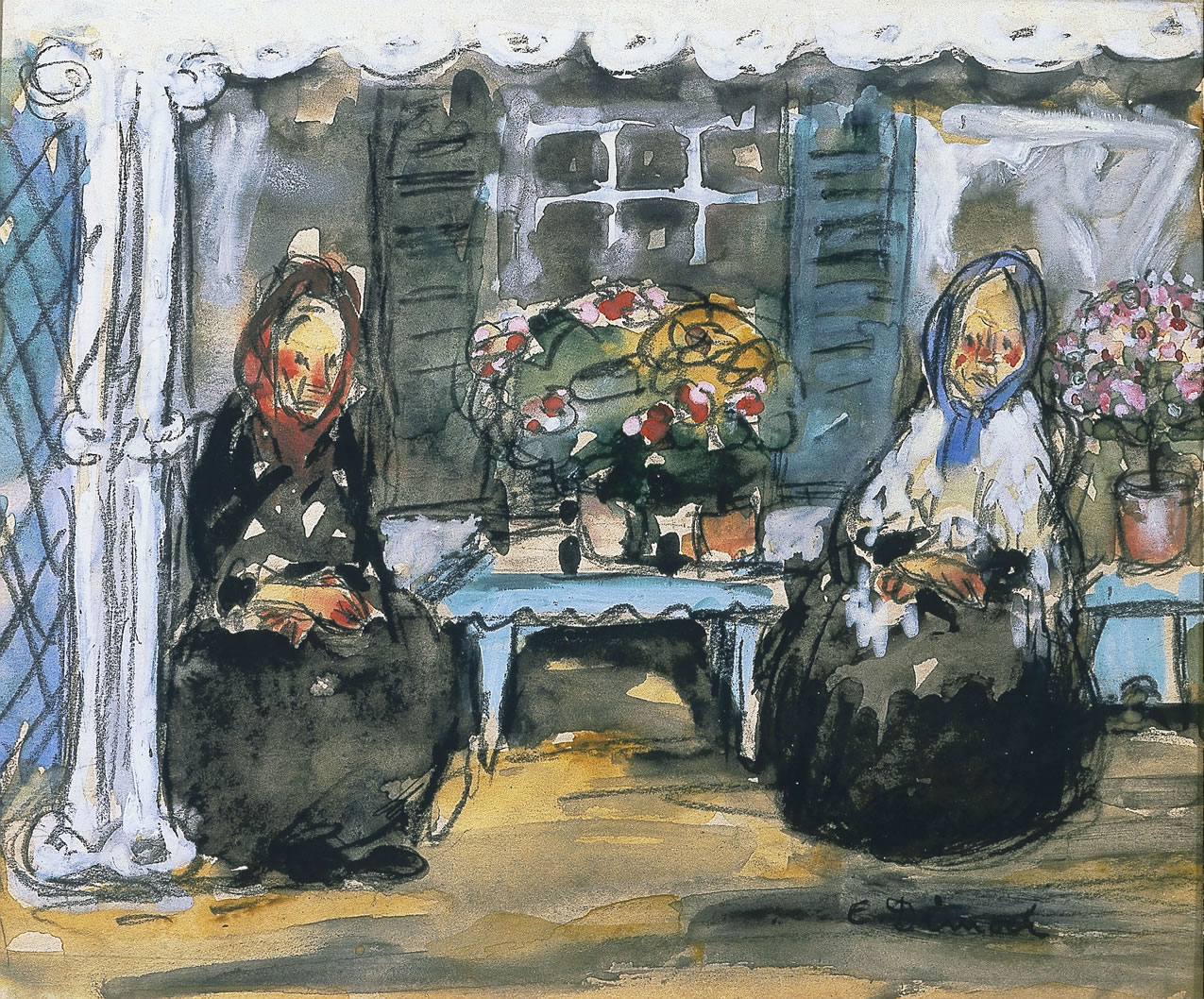
Mother and Daughter, c. 1913, watercolor, gouache, and charcoal on paper

In 1928 her watercolor Contemporary portraits were shown with Beulah Stevenson's at the Whitney Studio Club and were then part of a traveling show to the Art Students League in New York, Fogg Museum of Art, Denver Art Museum, Minneapolis Institute of Art, the California Palace of the Legion of Honor in San Francisco, and the Arts and Crafts Club in New Orleans. The Whitney Studio Club, led by women patrons, held a solo exhibition of Dimock's work.

== See also ==
- List of artists in the Armory Show
- List of women artists in the Armory Show
