= The "Genius" (novel) =

Novel by Theodore Dreiser

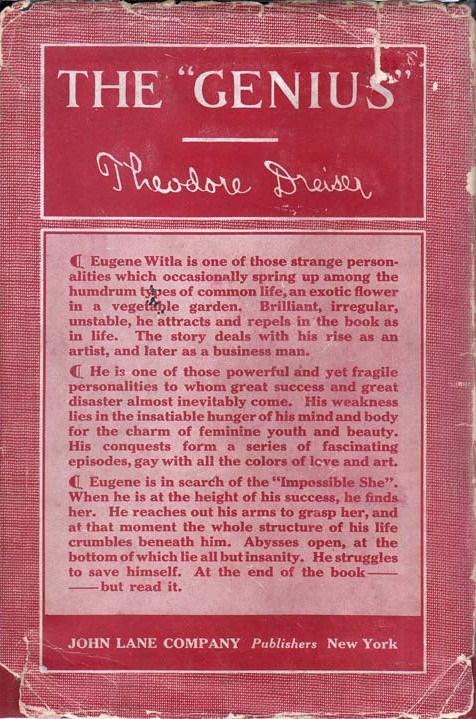
First edition (publ. John Lane)

The "Genius" is a semi-autobiographical novel by Theodore Dreiser, first published in 1915. The story concerns Eugene Witla, a talented painter of strong sexual desires who grapples with his commitment to his art and the force of his erotic needs. The book sold 8,000 copies in the months immediately following publication but encountered legal difficulties when it was declared potentially obscene. Dreiser's publisher was nervous about continuing publication and recalled the book from bookstores, and the novel did not receive broad distribution until 1923. When The "Genius" was reissued by a different publisher, the firm of Horace Liveright, it immediately sold more than 40,000 copies.

== Background ==
"The only figure of literary repute who ever rated The "Genius" as first among the novels of Theodore Dreiser was Theodore Dreiser," literary historian Larzer Ziff observed. His fifth published novel, The "Genius" was actually the third novel Dreiser began work on and, as his most autobiographical work, remained the novel closest to his heart. He worked on it in stages over a four-year period. The credit he felt he deserved (and did not receive) for his honesty about sexual urges and damaged relationships and his original publisher's decision not to stand by the novel in the face of criticism contributed to his lifelong feeling that the book had never been given its due. After An American Tragedy, it is his longest book; the final draft ran to over 700 pages in a close-set type.

While the protagonist of the book is in many ways a portrait of its author, Dreiser also loosely based Eugene Witla on some of the painters, artists working in an Ashcan realist style, whom he knew in New York at the time and whose studios he visited. The most likely candidate for a model is Everett Shinn, who painted urban scenes of the kind attributed to Witla and who was known as a promiscuous man.

== Plot ==
The novel is divided intro three sections: "Youth," "Struggle," and "Revolt." In Book I, Eugene Witla (like Sister Carrie, in Dreiser's earlier novel) escapes the confines of the small town in Illinois where he has been raised to make his way in Chicago. There he studies painting at the Chicago Art Institute and enjoys the excitement of the city and his first sexual experiences. He becomes engaged to a young woman, Angela Blue, with whom he is intimate before their marriage but, at all times, he finds it difficult to remain faithful. A life based on monogamy seems beyond him. In Book II, Eugene and Angela move to New York City, where he makes a name for himself in the art world as an urban realist but finds his marriage with the increasingly conventional Angela painfully limiting. They travel to Europe, he suffers a breakdown, and they return to New York where Eugene attempts to make a better living in the advertising world. Book III chronicles the deterioration of Eugene and Angela's marriage as he begins an affair with Suzanne Dale, the teenage daughter of a woman who works in the same office (this affair is one of the most autobiographical details in the book); Suzanne's mother and Angela do everything they can to end the relationship, but to no avail. In one scene, Angela, pregnant, comes upon her husband in bed with his teenaged girlfriend. Angela dies in childbirth, but her demise does not free Eugene to be with Suzanne. He ends the story alone, a man who has never been able to control his lust and uncertain of what use to put his talents, taking care of his newborn daughter.

== Response: Criticism and support ==
Reviews for The "Genius" were mixed at best. The New York Times of October 10, 1915, compared the book unfavorably with Sinclair Lewis's The Trail of the Hawk, describing it as "a study of the artistic temperament ... of ungoverned sexual passion and its effects on the life and work of an otherwise great artist" and complaining about its "abnormal length." The Kansas City Star, like many Midwestern dailies, went much further and labeled the novel "a procession of sordid philandering", while the Milwaukee Journal derided Dreiser as a "literary Caliban", wallowing in depravity. Stuart Sherman, a prominent academic, complained in The Nation that the author had confined himself to a mere "representation of animal behavior." Many reviews alluded to the ethnic background of the author at a time when anti-German feeling was on the rise. "The war was closing in on America and the Hun in Dreiser was held against him", Larzer Ziff wrote.

In The Smart Set, Dreiser's friend and long-time ally H. L. Mencken tried to find qualities to praise while acknowledging that the novel was rambling, formless, and chaotic. It "billows and rolls and bulges out like a cloud of smoke...it wobbles, straggles, strays, heaves, pitches, reels, staggers, wavers...." he wrote. He added, "It marks the high tide of his bad writing." (Dreiser, naturally, did not take criticism of this tenor from a friend any better than he took the attacks of conservatives like Stuart Sherman.)

Mencken was not the only friend and literary colleague to find the novel wanting. James Gibbons Huneker, a respected music, theater, art, and book reviewer, had assisted Dreiser with much-appreciated editorial suggestions for his earlier book, Jennie Gerhardt, but found Eugene Witla a "shallow bore...a nonentity" who did not deserve the implausible title "genius," even if the word was used with some degree of irony. He also questioned how well Dreiser knew the art world he was depicting: the kind of art Witla practiced, Ashcan realism, was anything but financially lucrative at the time.

John Cowper Powys was one of the few major critics to be unqualified in his praise of the book, comparing Dreiser's fearlessness about sex and even his admittedly excessive detail to Walt Whitman's erotic openness and love of long poetic catalogs. Edgar Lee Masters, author of Spoon River Anthology, and literary radical Randolph Bourne wrote in Dreiser's defense as well, as did noted publisher and editor Marion Reedy.

Many libraries and bookstores refused to stock the book, and the New York Society for the Suppression of Vice threatened legal action, leading Dreiser's supporters to issue their own call to arms. Critic Willard Huntington Wright, a former editor of the Los Angeles Times Book Review and The Smart Set and a Dreiser fan of long standing, threw himself "wholeheartedly into an anti-censorship campaign on behalf of [the novel]. Along with Alfred Knopf, John Cowper Powys, publisher Ben Huebsch, and Mencken, [he] circulated petitions and drummed up support wherever he could for the man he believed to be the most significant, unjustly harassed writer of the day." Eventually, five hundred writers signed an Authors' League petition on behalf of The "Genius", including Willa Cather, Max Eastman, Robert Frost, Sinclair Lewis, Jack London, Amy Lowell, Jack Reed, Edwin Arlington Robinson, Ida Tarbell, and Booth Tarkington.

A foreword to the 1923 reissue of the novel addressed the censorship issue directly: "It has been urged that this book is detrimental to the morals of the young and might have had a bad effect upon people with weak moral sense, but are thousands of perfectly normal and responsible people to be denied this form of aesthetic stimulation simply because it is harmful to children and perverts?"

== Sources ==
- Lingeman, Richard. Theodore Dreiser: An American Journey, 1908–1945, Volume II. New York: Putnam, 1990.
- Loving, Jerome. The Last Titan: A Life of Theodore Dreiser. Berkeley: University of California Press, 2005.
- Newlin, Keith (ed.). A Theodore Dreiser Encyclopedia. Greenwich, CT: Greenwood Press, 2003.
- Ziff, Larzer. "Afterword" in The "Genius." New York: Signet Classic/New American Library paperback edition, 1967.
