= William Glackens =

American painter (1870–1938)

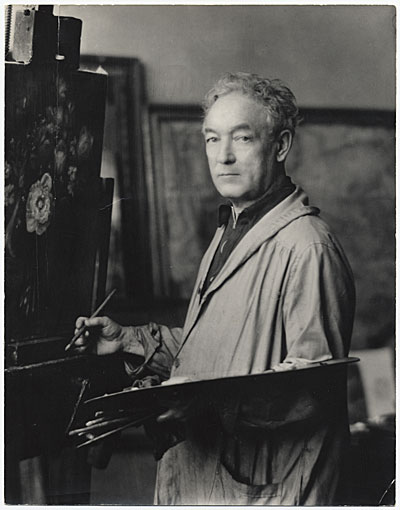
- William Glackens, circa 1915
- Born: March 13, 1870; Philadelphia, Pennsylvania, US
- Died: May 22, 1938 (aged 68); Westport, Connecticut, US
- Education: Pennsylvania Academy of the Fine Arts
- Known for: Painting, Etching, Drawing, Murals
- Movement: American realism

William James Glackens (March 13, 1870 – May 22, 1938) was an American realist painter and one of the founders of the Ashcan School, which rejected the formal boundaries of artistic beauty laid down by the conservative National Academy of Design. He is also known for his work in helping Albert C. Barnes to acquire the European paintings that form the nucleus of the famed Barnes Foundation in Philadelphia. His dark-hued, vibrantly painted street scenes and depictions of daily life in pre-WW I New York and Paris first established his reputation as a major artist. His later work was brighter in tone and showed the strong influence of Renoir. During much of his career as a painter, Glackens also worked as an illustrator for newspapers and magazines in Philadelphia and New York City.

== Early life ==
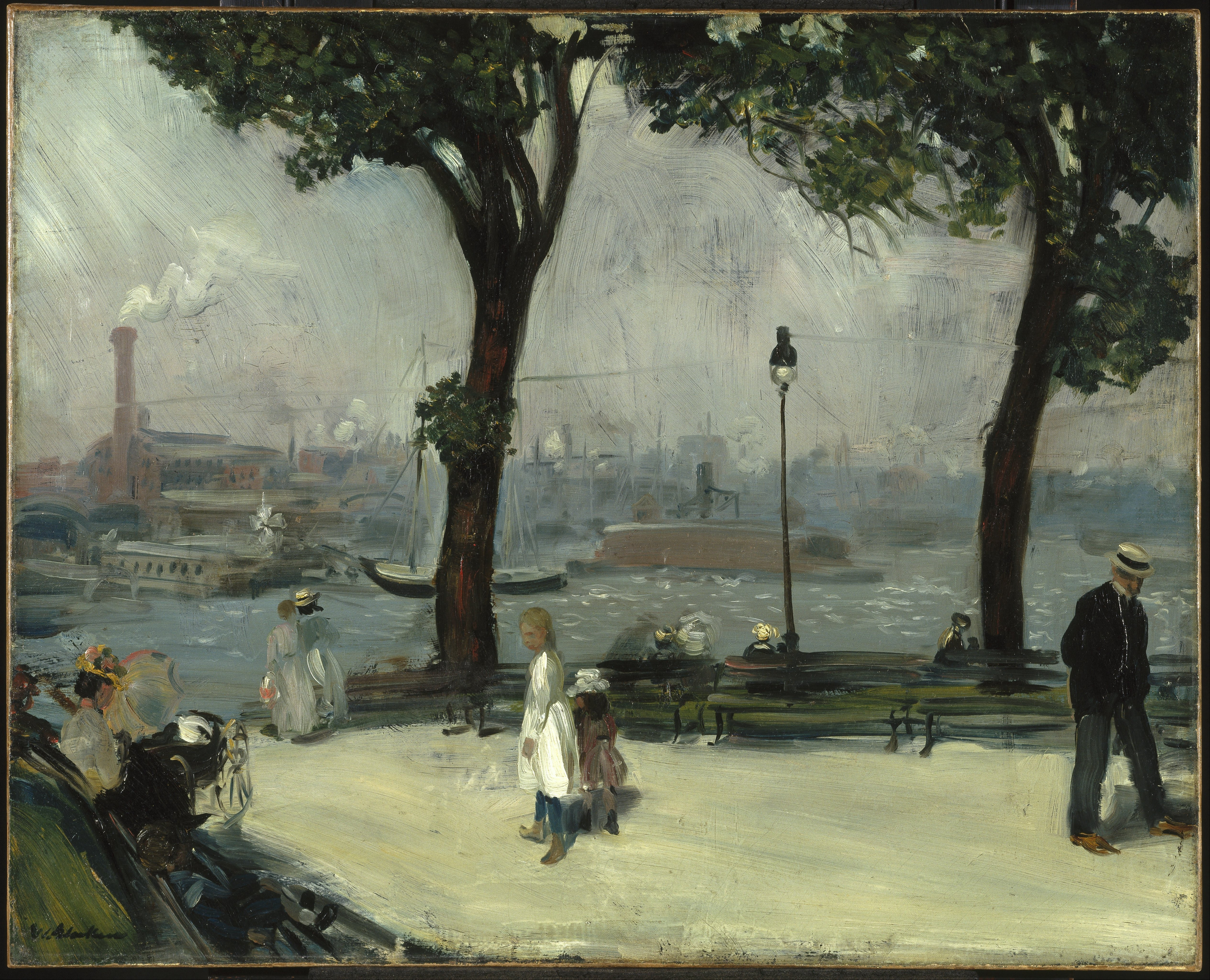
William Glackens. East River Park, ca. 1902. Oil on canvas. Brooklyn Museum

Glackens was born in Philadelphia, Pennsylvania, where his family had lived for many years. William had two siblings: an older sister, Ada, and an older brother, cartoonist and illustrator Louis Glackens. He graduated from the prestigious Central High School in 1890. Throughout his school years, he showed a great interest in and aptitude for drawing and drafting. In November 1891, he enrolled at the Pennsylvania Academy of the Fine Arts. His portrait work often included friends, family, and socialites, characterized by a keen eye for detail and a gentle, sometimes playful, depiction of his subjects. These portraits are celebrated for their warmth and character. Glackens also painted numerous still lifes, focusing on flowers, fruit, and other everyday objects. These works are known for their rich textures and vibrant use of color, showcasing his mastery of composition and light. During his travels, Glackens painted numerous scenes from Paris and Venice, capturing the essence of these cities through his unique lens. These works are notable for their romanticism and the influence of European painting styles.

== Career ==
=== Newspaper illustration and transition into painting ===
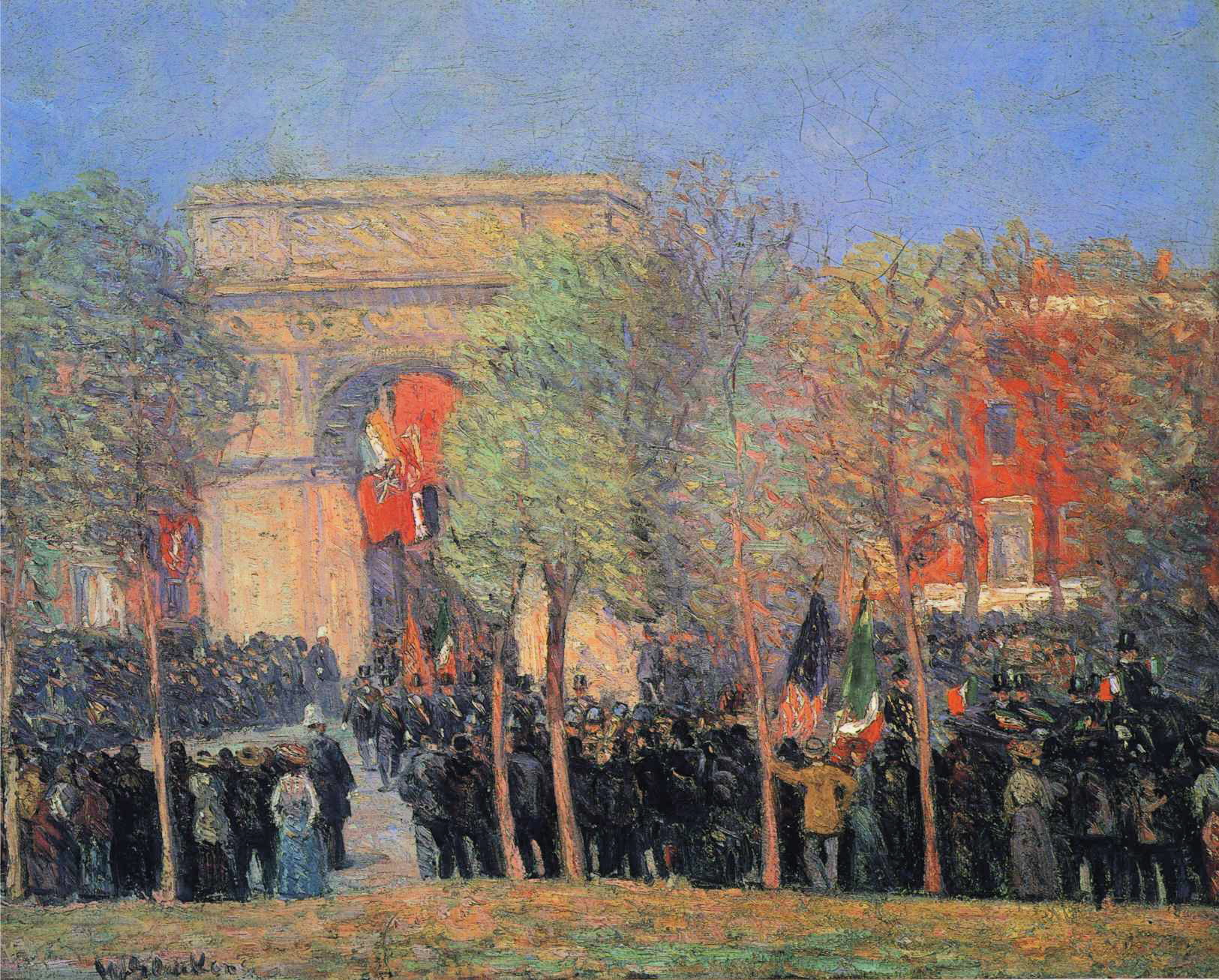
Italo-American Celebration, Washington Square, 1912, Boston Museum of Fine Arts

After graduation, Glackens became an artist-reporter for The Philadelphia Record. In 1892, he left that newspaper and began illustrating for the Philadelphia Press. He enrolled in evening classes at the Pennsylvania Academy of the Fine Arts, studying under Thomas Anshutz. Glackens was not a steady pupil, as art critic Forbes Watson would observe in 1923: "So much impression did the various instructors make upon him that today he can hardly remember who taught there when he was a pupil." John Sloan also attended the academy, and he introduced Glackens to Robert Henri, a talented painter and charismatic figure in Philadelphia art circles. Henri played host to regular artists' gatherings at his studio, occasions to socialize, drink, sketch, talk about art, and give artistic criticism of one another's work. Henri urged the young men he brought together to read Whitman and Emerson, William Morris Hunt's Talks on Art and George Moore's Modern Painting, and to think about the need to create a vigorous new American art that spoke to their time and experience. These gatherings were the inspirational beginning of what became known as the Ashcan school of American art, a style that rejected the formality and gentility of 19th-century academic art and looked to working-class and middle-class metropolitan life for its material.

In 1895, Glackens traveled to Europe with several fellow painters, including Henri, to paint and to immerse himself in European art. He first visited Holland where he studied the Dutch masters. He then moved to Paris, where he rented a studio for a year with Henri and enjoyed his first exposure to the art of the Impressionists and Post-Impressionists. (For both men, "Manet became an idol.") Such a trip was common for artists of the time who wished to establish themselves in an American art world still looked upon as provincial by those artists and art lovers with a deeper experience of the Old Masters and the new art movements. While in Paris, Glackens painted independently, but did not attend any classes. Later in life, a confirmed Francophile, Glackens returned periodically to paint in Paris and the south of France.

Upon settling in New York in 1896, Glackens began work as an artist for the New York World, a position he attained through his friend and fellow illustrator George Luks, a painter who had also been a participant in the Henri studio sessions in Philadelphia. Glackens later became a sketch artist for the New York Herald. He also worked as an illustrator for various magazines, including McClure's Magazine, which sent him to Cuba to cover the Spanish–American War. At this time, Glackens was making a living as a magazine illustrator, but his real passion lay in painting. In 1901, he exhibited at the Allen Gallery with Henri and Sloan and thereafter gained favorable notice as an up-and-coming artist.

In 1904, Glackens married Edith Dimock, the daughter of a wealthy Connecticut family. She was also an artist, and they lived together in a Greenwich Village townhouse, where they raised two children, Lenna and Ira. If many of their artist friends lived a bohemian life by the standards of the day, such was not the case with William and Edith Glackens. In 1957, Ira Glackens published an anecdotal book about his father and the role he played in the emerging realist movement in art.

In 1906 he was elected into the National Academy of Design as an Associate member, and became a full Academician in 1933.

=== Glackens and The Eight ===
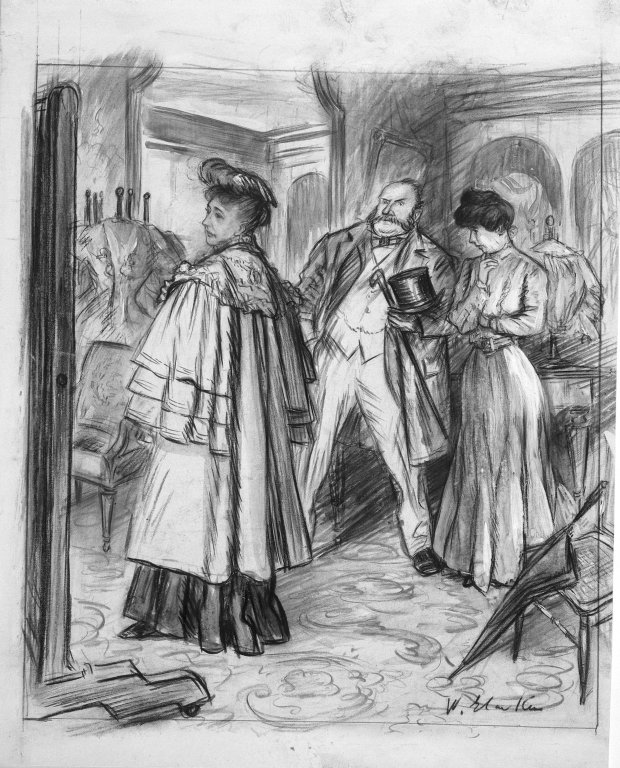
'My dear,' he instructed her patiently under the girl's approving eyes, 'you will find it always pays to get the best', Brooklyn Museum.

In New York, Glackens became associated with a group of artists known today as The Eight, five of whom (Robert Henri, John Sloan, George Luks, and Everett Shinn as well as Glackens) are considered Ashcan realists. The other members of this loose association were Arthur B. Davies, Ernest Lawson, and Maurice Prendergast. "The Eight" was not a term of the group's own choosing, but after their first exhibition in 1908, it became their unofficial title in the press, alluding to the fact that the artists' cause had little to do with stylistic similarities and everything to do with art politics. These eight men had decided to hold a separate exhibition after experiencing repeated rejection from the "official" exhibitions at the powerful, conservative National Academy of Design. Their breakaway venture was, in part, a way of protesting that controlling body's rigid definition of artistic beauty. Their show at the Macbeth Gallery was a small-scale "succès de scandale" and toured several cities from Newark to Chicago in an traveling exhibition curated by Sloan. The painters gained wider recognition and were invited to exhibit at many institutions. More importantly, they had initiated a national debate about acceptable subject matter in art and the need to end the constraints of The Genteel Tradition in American culture. Most of the Eight also participated in the "Exhibition of Independent Artists" in 1910, a further attempt to break down the exclusivity of the academy.

Glackens, Henri, Sloan, Luks, and Shinn were key figures in the realist movement in the visual arts during the years (c. 1895–1920) when challenging writers of realist fiction, such as Stephen Crane, Theodore Dreiser, and Frank Norris, were gaining wider audiences and struggling to set aside the Genteel Tradition in American letters. The painters depicted robust, sometimes inelegant urban themes and welcomed artistic freedom. They were not concerned with modernist techniques; their focus was on energetic painting and fresh, accessible subject matter. Glackens was an integral part of the group. The genre aspects of Ashcan art are evident in his work of the time, particularly in paintings like Hammerstein's Roof Garden (1901), Easter River from Brooklyn (1902), Tugboat and Lighter (1904), and Winter, Central Park (1905).

=== Glackens at home ===
Glackens' friend, artist Jerome Myers, recalls in his autobiography Artist In Manhattan his visits with Glackens: "The studio home of William Glackens, on Ninth Street just off Fifth Avenue, partook of the charm of this fine, boasted period. It was a delightful privilege for my wife and me to participate occasionally in the at-homes of the Glackens[es] during the season. Surrounded by the masterpieces of William Glackens, friends would gather in congenial remembrance: Edith Glackens, always an amusing hostess; William Glackens, quietly reminiscing with his companions. The young Glackens[es], Lenna and Ira, filled out the family picture, happy with their young artist friends, as well as with older friends who had known them since childhood. Of the latter were Everett Shinn and Guy Pène du Bois....the whole scene [was] imbued with the spirit of a New York that is now passing."

=== Later work ===
By 1910, Glackens began to concentrate on a "highly personal coloristic style" which represented a break from the Ashcan approach to art. It was, his biographer William Gerdts wrote, "his conversion to mainstream Impressionism." His work was often compared to that of Renoir, to the point that he was called "the American Renoir." Glackens' response to this criticism was always the same: "Can you think of a better man to follow than Renoir?" In aesthetic terms, Glackens' link to his friends who were a part of the Ashcan movement was always tenuous. Ultimately, Glackens was a "pure" painter for whom the sensuousness of the art form was paramount, not a social chronicler or an artist with a bent for politics or provocation.

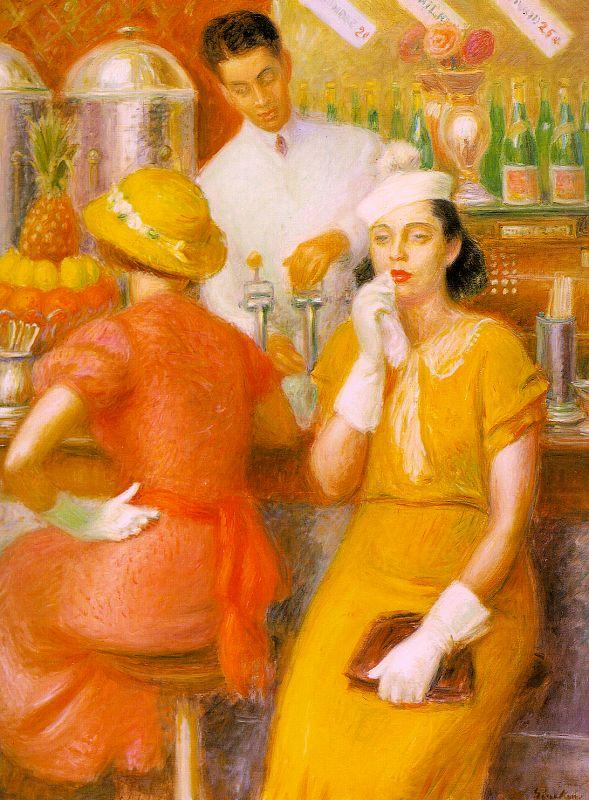
Soda Fountain, 1935

At this time, millionaire-inventor Albert C. Barnes, a classmate and friend from Central High School, began to study and collect modern art. He commissioned Glackens to buy him some "advanced" works while on a trip to Paris. Glackens returned from Paris with about twenty paintings, which included works by Cézanne, Renoir, Manet, and Matisse, formed the core of what became the Barnes Foundation Collection. Glackens also advised Barnes on later art movements and purchases. Among New York artists, Glackens was known for his sophisticated eye and his wide and cosmopolitan tastes. Not surprisingly, he was less unnerved by the European modernism of the 1913 Armory Show than some of his Ashcan colleagues who saw that exhibition as a threat to American realist art.

In 1916, Glackens served as the president of the newly founded Society of Independent Artists, whose mission was to provide broader exhibition opportunities for lesser-known artists. He continued to travel to France between 1925 and 1935 to study the work of the Impressionists and the Post-Impressionists. His paintings received gold medals from annual exhibitions at the Pennsylvania Academy of Fine Arts in 1933 and again in 1936. In contrast to many of his friends among The Eight, such as Sloan and Luks, whose personal lives were turbulent and whose finances were uncertain, Glackens enjoyed a happy marriage, a contented home life, and a steady career, though by the 1930s he was seen by a younger generation interested in abstraction, surrealism, and political art as an old-fashioned artist.

== Death and legacy ==
Glackens died suddenly while vacationing in Westport, Connecticut on May 22, 1938. He was interred at Cedar Hill Cemetery in Hartford, Connecticut.

His posthumous retrospective at the Whitney Museum of American Art several months later, also shown at the Carnegie Institute at Pittsburgh, was well received. His legacy is linked to that of the Ashcan school and The Eight. Although he distanced himself from some of their ideals, William Glackens continued to be considered an integral part of the realist movement in American art.

== Style and subject matter ==
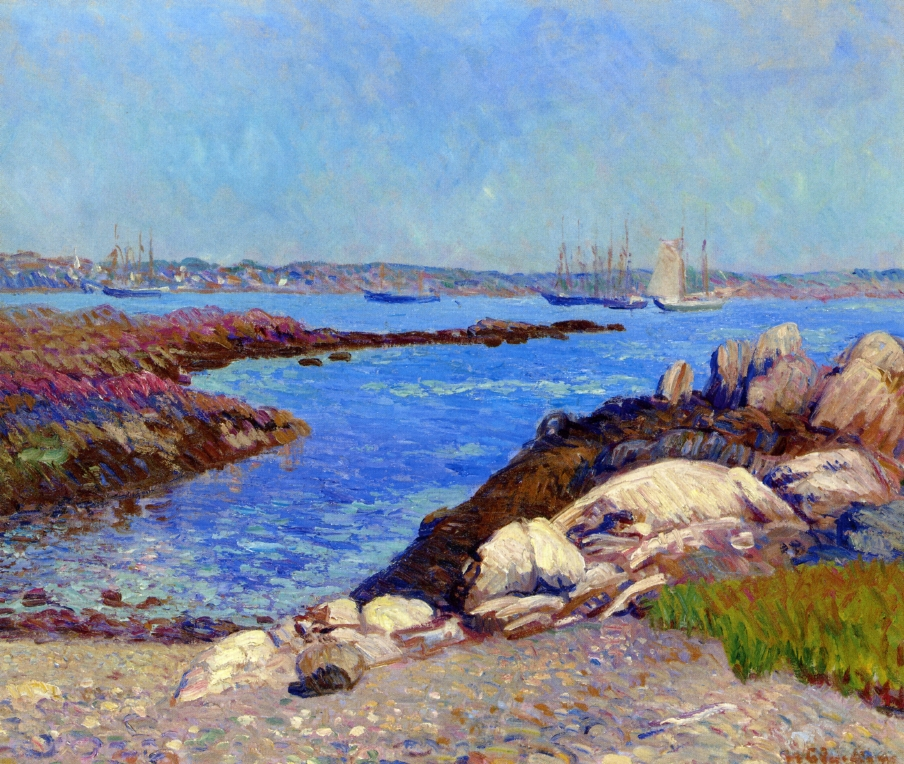
Portsmouth Harbor, New Hampshire, 1909

Glackens' subject matter and style changed throughout his life. Influenced by the work he saw during his time in Europe, from Hals and Manet to Frank Duveneck and the Impressionists, Glackens’ early work uses dark, dramatic colors and slashing, overlapping brushstrokes. He depicted scenes of urban life in Paris and its suburbs and painted the theaters and parks of Manhattan. He continued this style and subject matter for some time until he began to break away from The Eight. At that point, his most common subject matter was landscapes, especially beach scenes. Later Glackens became best known for his portraits, and late in his life he focused on still lifes. Despite the changing subject matter, Glackens’ work was clearly the product of a man who loved the fluid, unrestrained quality of oil on canvas. Forbes Watson asserted that Glackens focused on strong color effects, above all else, because "the color of the world makes him thoroughly happy and to express that happiness in color has become his first and most natural impulse." His paintings are, paradoxically, "haunted by the spectre of happiness, obsessed with the contemplation of joy." In many ways, he was always the gentlest, least radical of the Ashcan artists.

Glackens is sometimes criticized for his similarity to Renoir. He was branded an imitator. The charge was made that during the 1920s and 1930s “his once vigorous artistic personality had been blunted by too close an imitation of Renoir’s late style.” Glackens himself seems not to have been affected by any doubts about his own purpose and originality. His art did not reflect the social crises of the day, such as the Great Depression; rather, it offered a refuge from that darkness.

== Analysis of artworks ==
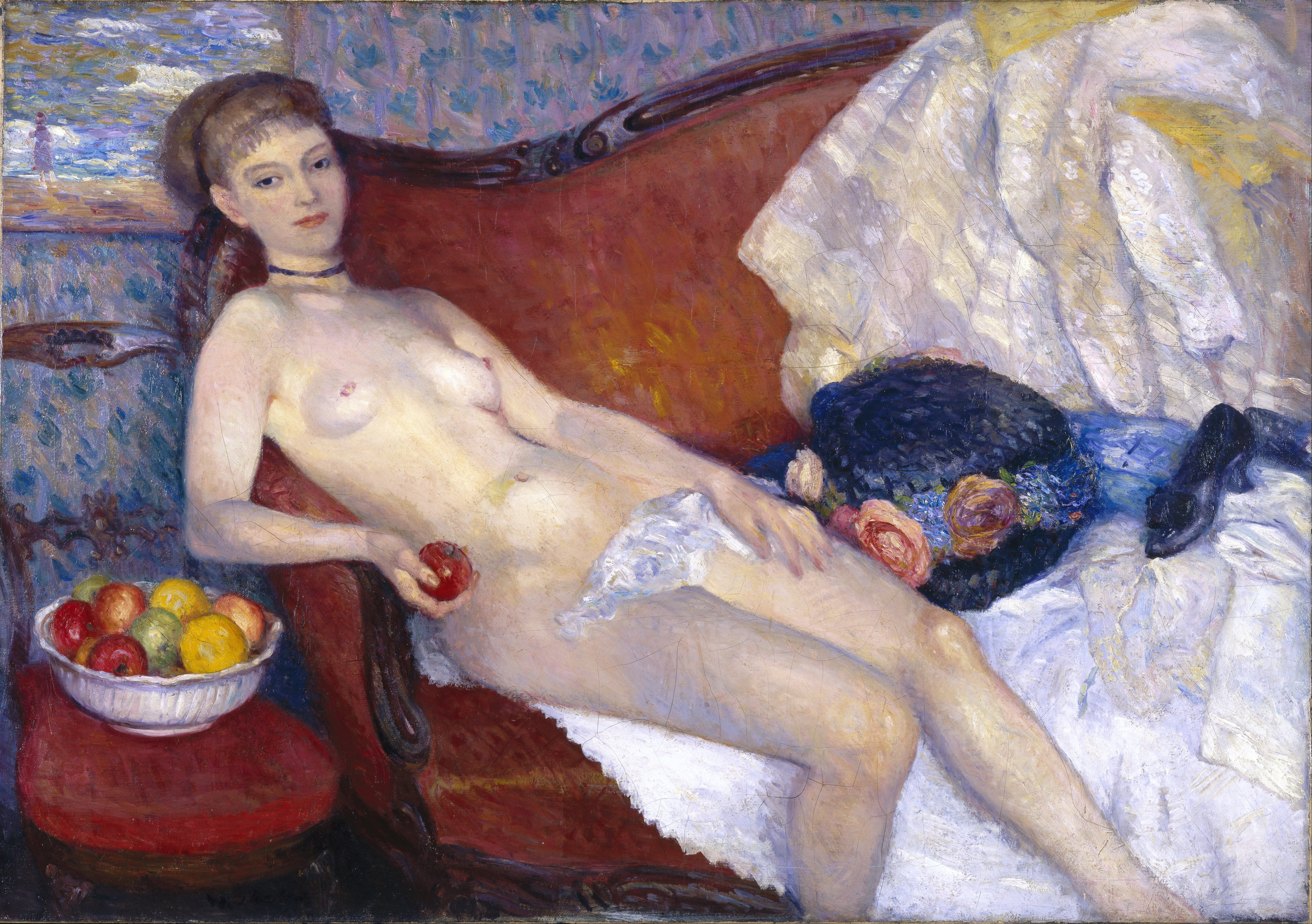
Nude with Apple (1910), Brooklyn Museum

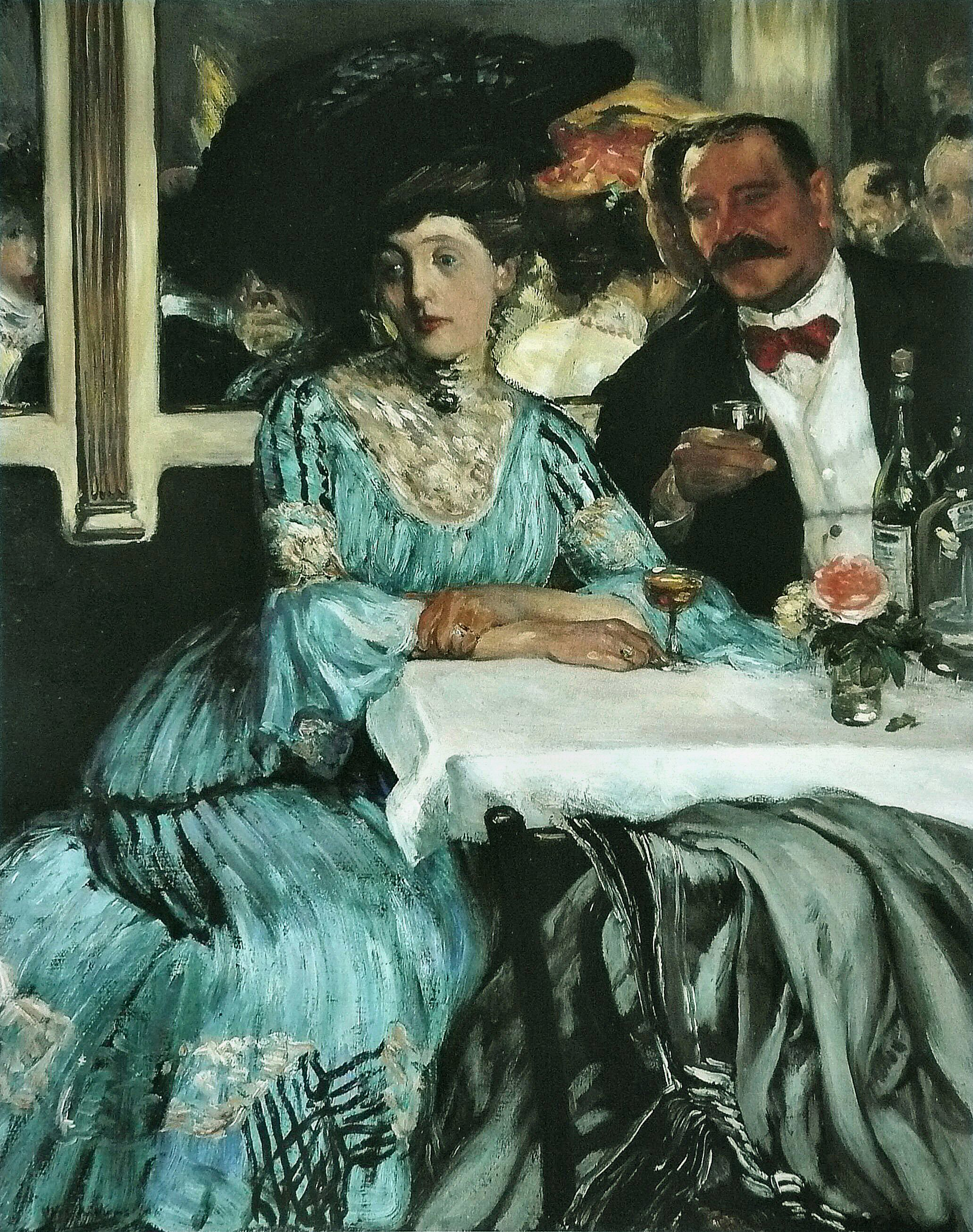
At Mouquin's (1905), the Art Institute of Chicago

Nude with Apple, in the collection of the Brooklyn Museum, is a signature work of Glackens’ post-Ashcan career. It is said to represent the turning point in his style and his division with The Eight. It depicts a model resting on a couch, holding an apple. "The model's slightly weary but forthright expression, and even the ribbon tied around her neck, call to mind Manet's Olympia...a modern Eve." A humorously incongruous touch is her hat, placed on the couch next to her unclothed body as if she had just arrived or was preparing soon to leave. The languid pose, the comfortable interior setting, and the notable attention paid to bright, vivid colors set this painting apart from those of the Ashcan painters. It is interesting to compare the finished work to an earlier study in pastel. Glackens' working method included making numbers of sketches which focused on separate elements of the composition.

Chez Mouquin, in the collection of the Art Institute of Chicago, is arguably Glackens's most celebrated painting. It is set in the well-known Sixth Avenue restaurant regularly visited by Glackens and many of his associates. This lush painting portrays a robust, red-tied James B. Moore, restaurateur and middle-aged bon vivant, at a table with one of the many young women he squired about town. He is drinking, while the lady is turned away, looking somewhat less interested in the convivial scene around them. The backs of their heads are reflected in the mirror behind them, as are the faces and profiles of others, including Edith Glackens and her art critic brother-in-law, Charles Fitzgerald. The painting is often compared to those of Degas, but “the sense of despair in Degas’s [cafe] pictures is replaced in the Glackens by a buoyant 'joie de vivre.'"

Portrait of the Artist’s Wife, in the collection of the Wadsworth Atheneum, portrays Edith Glackens seated next to a fruit still life. It is one of many of Glackens’ family portraits; he also painted likenesses of several members of The Eight, which are among his most notable works. The portrait of his wife does not idealize Edith. Rather, Glackens “frankly acknowledges her pert nose and small chin,” while still depicting her as an imposing but inviting presence. Among New York artists and artists' wives, Edith was known as a formal yet gracious and empathetic woman, impressions which her husband's portrait confirms.

== Major collectors ==
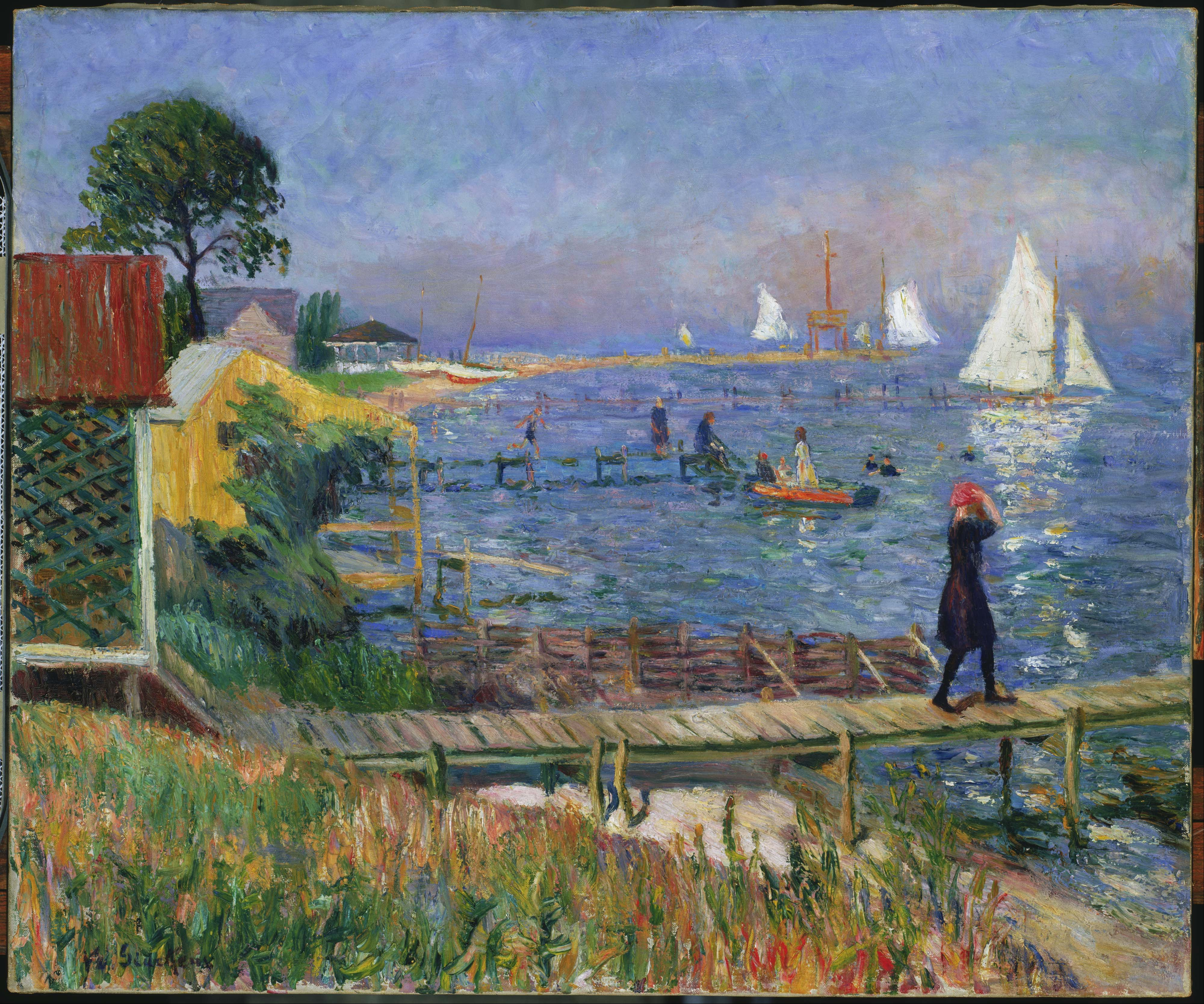
Bathers at Bellport, c. 1912, the Phillips Collection

Collector Albert C. Barnes bought many of Glackens’ best paintings, some of which are exhibited by the Barnes Foundation in Philadelphia. Gertrude Vanderbilt Whitney and Juliana Force were admirers and purchased works for the collection of the Whitney Museum of American Art. Duncan Phillips purchased a Glackens oil for the Phillips Collection in Washington, D.C.

The largest collection of Glackens' art has been housed since 2001 at NSU Art Museum Fort Lauderdale, where an entire wing is dedicated to his work; the museum holds approximately 500 Glackens paintings in its permanent collection. Glackens’ collections are celebrated for their ability to bring the vibrancy of early 20th-century American life to the canvas, blending realism with the lively brushwork and color schemes of Impressionism. His works continue to be admired for their portrayal of both the ordinary and the elegant aspects of life.

== Selected exhibitions ==
1908: The Eight Exhibition: Macbeth Galleries, New York City 1910: Exhibition of Independent Artists: traveling exhibition 1913: The Armory Show: New York 1937: New York Realists: Whitney Museum of American Art 1938: William Glackens: Memorial Exhibition: Whitney Museum of American Art 1943: The Eight: Brooklyn Museum of Art 1992: Painters of a New Century: The Eight and American Art: The Brooklyn Museum 1995: Metropolitan Lives: The Ashcan Artists and Their New York: National Museum of American Art 2000: City Life Around the Eight: Metropolitan Museum of Art 2002: Scenes of American Life: Treasures from the Smithsonian American Art Museum: Dayton Art Institute 2007: Life's Pleasures: The Ashcan Artists' Brush with Leisure, 1895-1925: New York Historical Society, 2014-15: "William Glackens, Artist and Friend": Barnes Foundation

== Selected works ==
- Autumn Landscape, ca. 1895. Oil on canvas
- Portrait of the Artist’s Wife, 1904. Oil on canvas
- Chez Mouquin, 1905. Oil on canvas
- Maypole, Central Park, 1905. Oil on canvas
- Central Park in Winter, 1905. Oil on canvas
- Nude with Apple, 1910. Oil on canvas
- March Day, Washington Square, 1912. Oil on canvas
- Sledding, Central Park, 1912. Oil on canvas
- Bathing at Bellport, Long Island, 1912. Oil on canvas
- Beach Scene, New London, 1918. Oil on canvas
- Woman in Blue Hat, ca. 1918. Oil on canvas
- Flowers in a Quimper Pitcher, ca. 1930. Oil on canvas
- The Soda Fountain, 1935. Oil on canvas
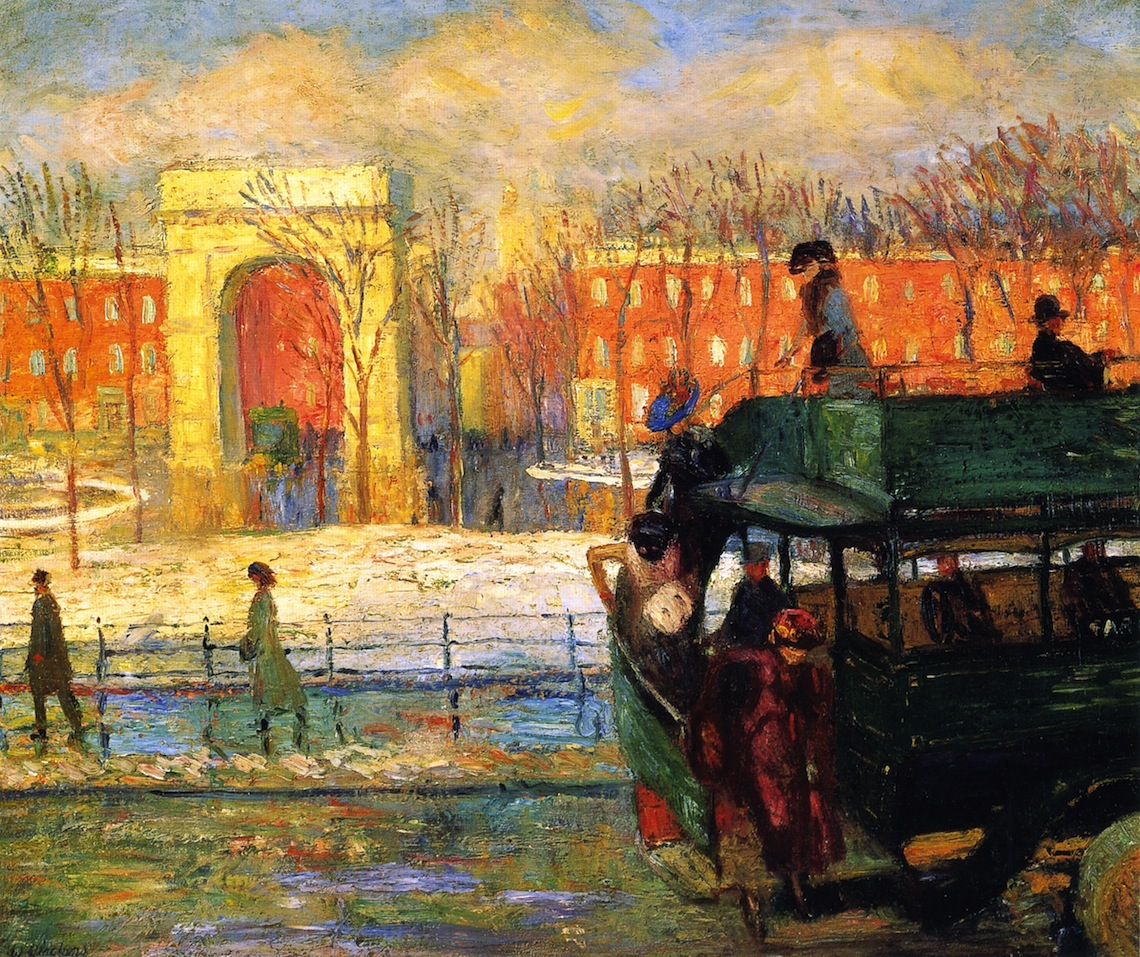
Descending from the Bus (1910)

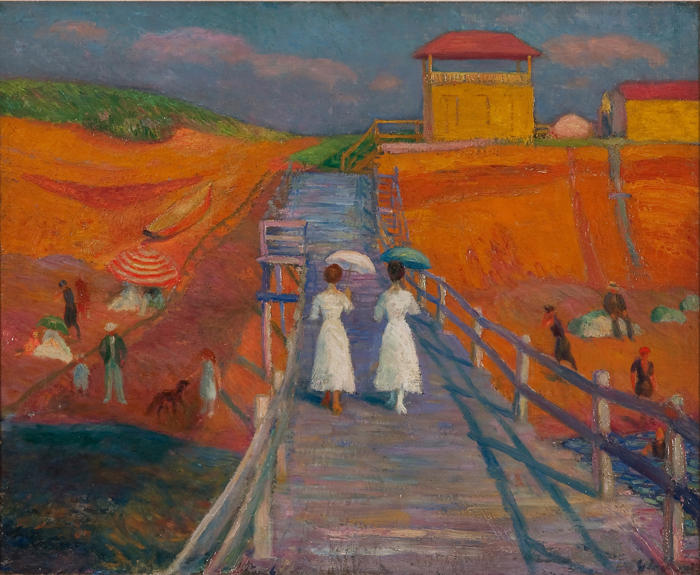
Cape Cod Pier (1908)

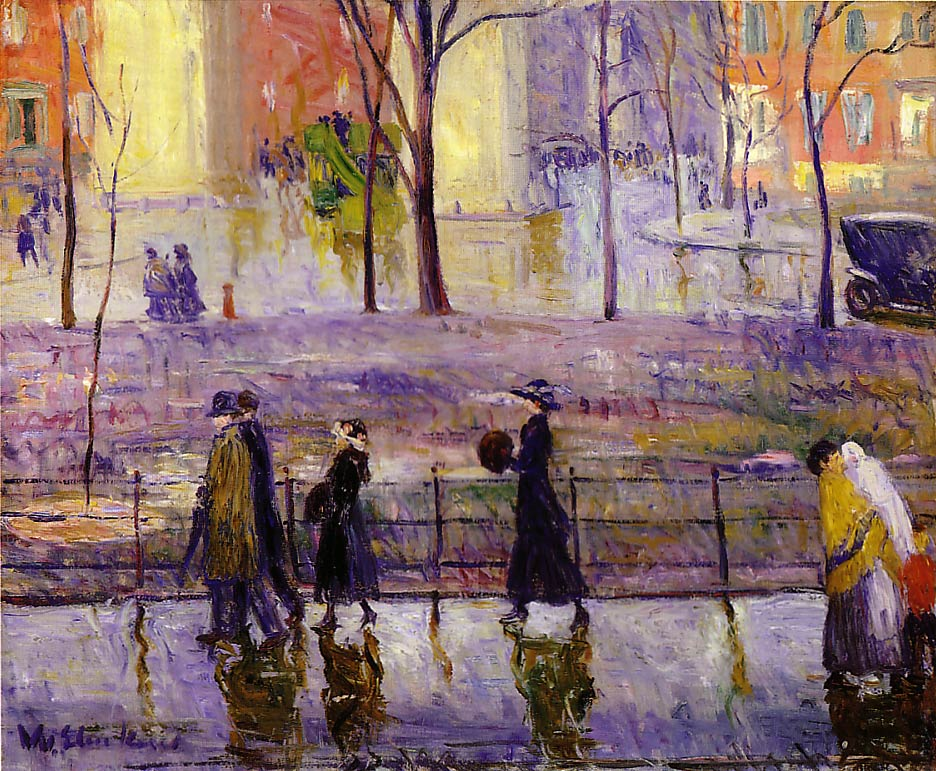
March Day Washington Park (1912)

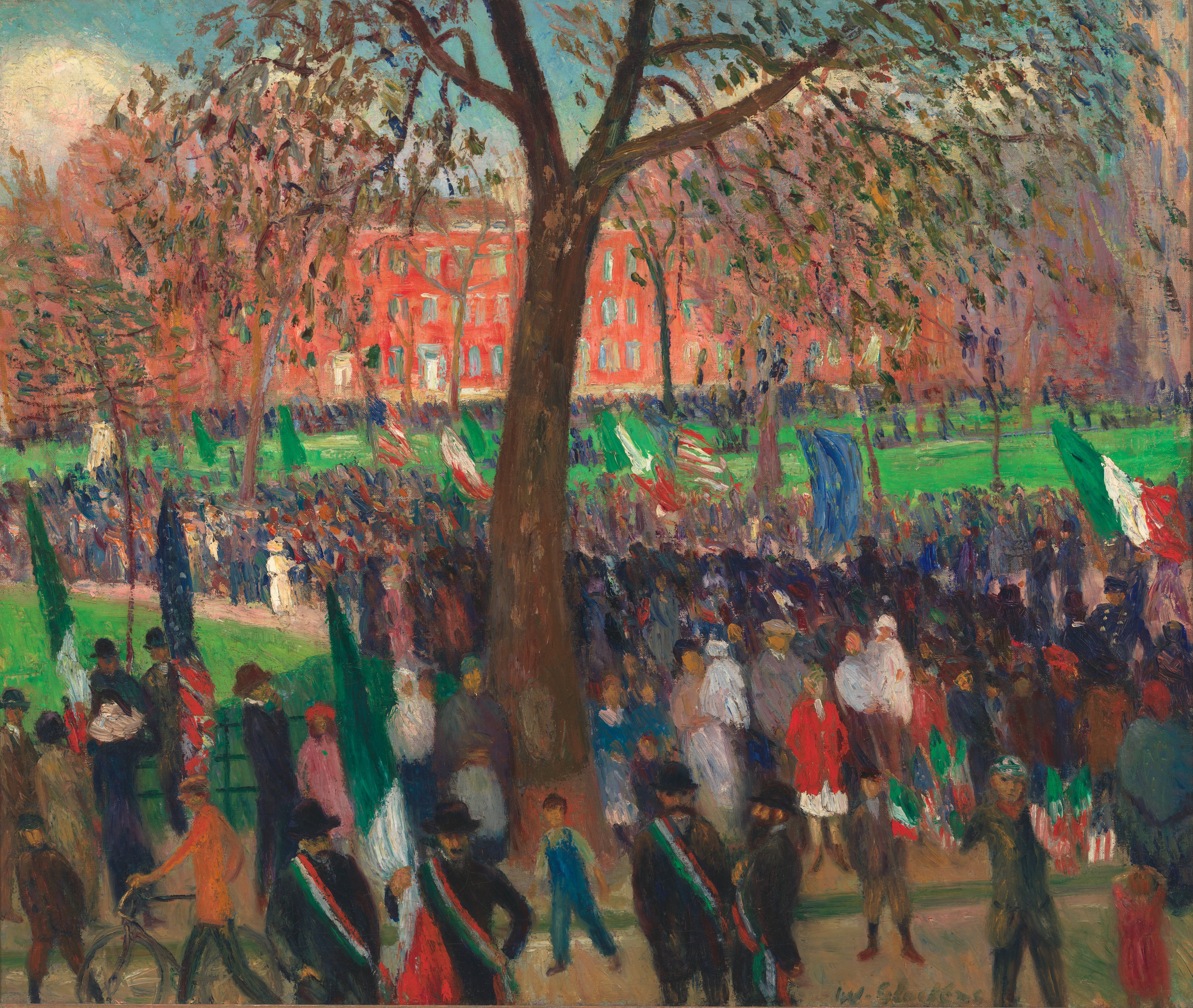
Parade, Washington Square (1912)

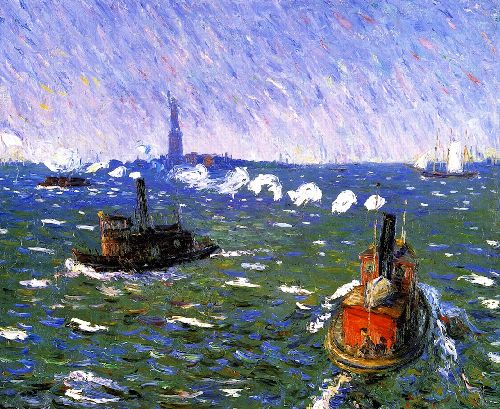
Breezy Day Tugboats, New York Harbor (1910)

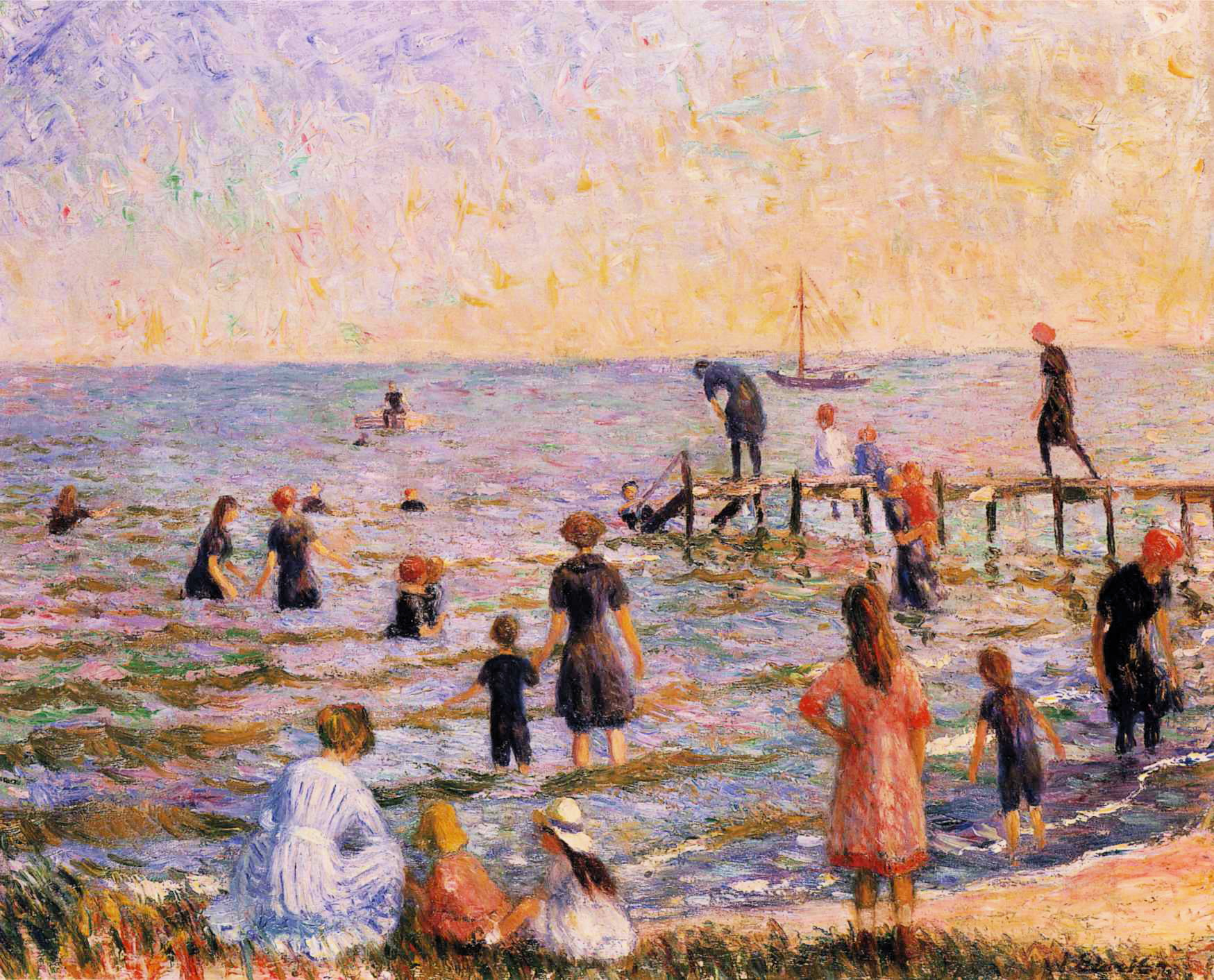
Bathing at Bellport (1912)

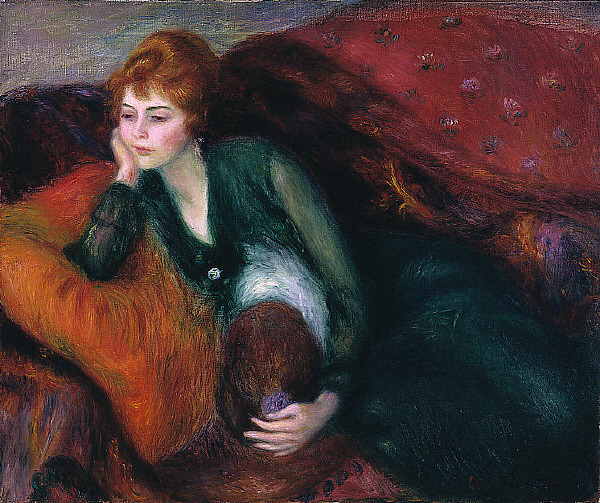
Young Woman in Green (ca. 1915)

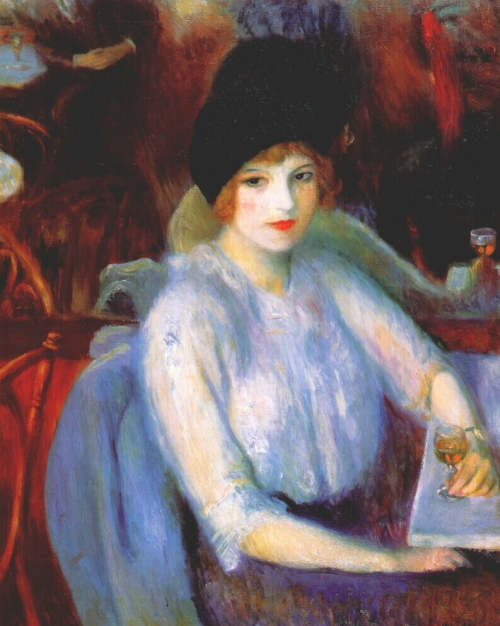
Cafe Lafayette (Kay Laurel) (1914)

== Sources ==
- Brown, Milton. American Painting from the Armory Show to the Depression. Princeton: Princeton University Press, 1955.
- Gerdts, William H. William Glackens. New York: Abbeville Press, 1996.
- Glackens, Ira. William Glackens and the Ashcan Group: The Emergence of Realism in American Art. New York: Crown, 1957.
- Homer, William Innes. Robert Henri and His Circle. Ithaca: Cornell University Press, 1969.
- Hughes, Robert. American Visions: The Epic History of Art in America. New York: Knopf,
- Kennedy, Elizabeth (ed.) The Eight and American Modernisms. Chicago: University of Chicago Press, 2009.
- Loughery, John. John Sloan: Painter and Rebel. New York: Henry Holt, 1997.
- Milroy, Elizabeth. Painters of a New Century: The Eight and American Art. Brooklyn: Brooklyn Museum, 1992.
- Metropolitan Lives: The Ashcan Artists and Their New York. Washington, D.C.: National Museum of American Art, 1995.
- Perlman, Bennard B. Painters of the Ashcan School: The Immortal Eight. New York: Dover, 1979.
- Watson, Forbes. William Glackens. New York, Duffield & Co, 1923.
