= Everett Shinn =

American painter (1876–1953)

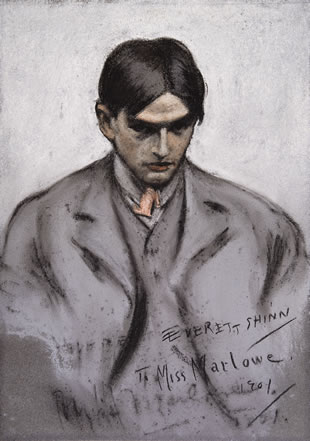
- Self-portrait done in 1901 in his charcoal style
- Born: November 6, 1876; Woodstown, New Jersey, U.S.
- Died: May 1, 1953 (aged 76); New York City, U.S.
- Known for: Painting, set design
- Movement: Modernism, realism

Everett Shinn (November 6, 1876 – May 1, 1953) was an American painter and member of the urban realist Ashcan School.

Shinn started as a newspaper illustrator in Philadelphia, demonstrating a rare facility for depicting animated movement, a skill that would, however, soon be eclipsed by photography. Here he worked with William J. Glackens, George Luks and John Sloan, who became core-members of the Ashcan School, led by Robert Henri, which defied official good taste in favor of robust images of real life. Shinn is best known for scenes of disaster or street violence, as well as theatrical subjects, regarding the theatre as a place of satisfying illusion. Shinn was the only Ashcan artist who preferred to work in pastels. He was reportedly a model for the protagonist of Theodore Dreiser's novel The "Genius".

== Early life ==
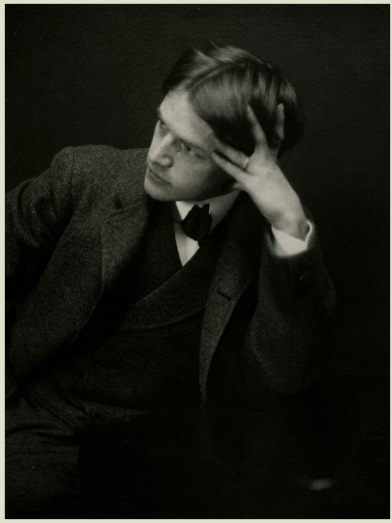
Everett Shinn

Shinn was born on November 6, 1876, in Woodstown, New Jersey, a Quaker-dominated community. His parents Isaiah Conklin Shinn and Josephine Ransley Shinn were rural farmers. He was their second son, and he was named for the author Edward Everett Hale, who his father admired. "Shinn's ability to draw was evident from very early childhood."

At age 15 he was enrolled at the Spring Garden Institute in Philadelphia, where he studied mechanical drawing, engineering, and industrial design 1890–1893. Later he took classes at the Pennsylvania Academy of the Fine Arts 1893–1897, studying under Thomas P. Anschutz. By age 17, Shinn was working nights as a staff artist for the Philadelphia Press.

Moving to New York City in 1897, he was soon known as one of the more talented urban realists who were chronicling in paint the energy and class divisions of modern metropolitan life. He worked for the newspaper the New York World. In 1898 Shinn married Florence "Flossie" Scovel, another artist from New Jersey; in 1912 they divorced, and in 1913 he married Corinne Baldwin, going on to have two children, Janet and David. By 1933 Shinn had divorced two more wives and was the subject of many tabloid rumors. Though he exhibited less frequently later in his life, Shinn had a well-established career by the 1920s but suffered serious financial losses during the Depression and sold very few paintings during that time. Between 1937 and his death in 1953, Shinn received several awards for his paintings and participated in a number of exhibitions; he would always be associated, however, with the achievements of the Ashcan School of American art c. 1900–1920. He died of lung cancer in New York City in 1953. Shinn was reportedly a model for the talented, promiscuous artist-protagonist of Theodore Dreiser's 1915 novel The "Genius". With his well-known taste for the good life, Shinn was dubbed by art historian Sam Hunter "the dandy of the realists."

== Career ==
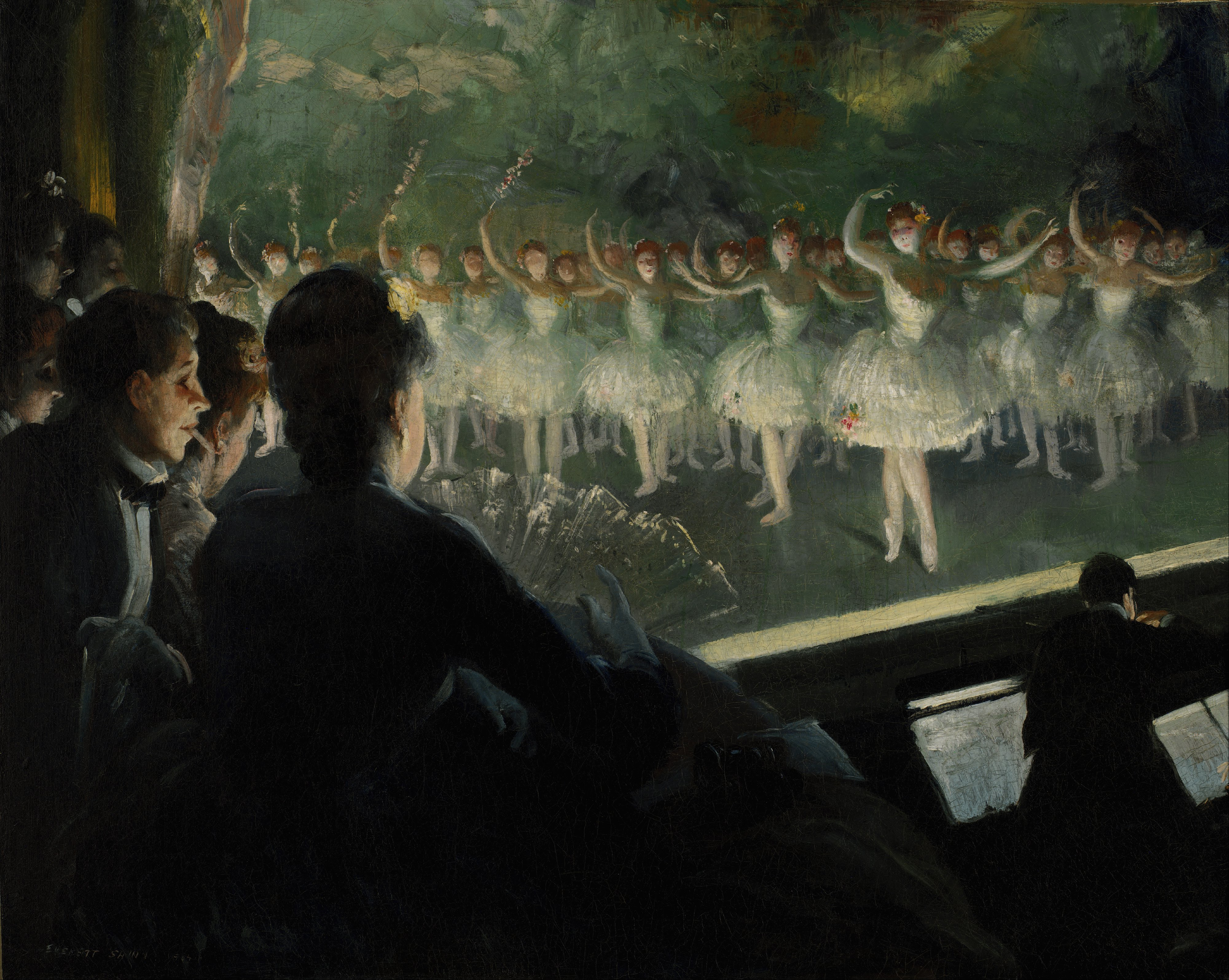
The White Ballet

Most art historians, as well as Shinn himself, consider his employment by the Philadelphia Press the true beginning of his art career. He was entering the field of newspaper illustration in its heyday, and he was a draftsman of great facility. (In later years, Shinn would express his dismay over the development of photography as the new art form that eventually replaced drawing as the principal source of visuals in all American newspapers.) Shinn moved from paper to paper for the rest of his illustrating career, receiving a larger salary with each move. The ability to convey animated movement and the attention to detail necessary for his newspaper illustrations is reflected in Shinn's paintings and pastels, especially those treating urban themes.

In 1899, he quit the newspaper business and began working for Ainslee's Magazine, a magazine that also employed his wife, who was by that time a successful illustrator and who brought in a good deal of the household income. He ultimately illustrated for a wide range of popular journals over the next twenty years, including Harper's, Vanity Fair, Life, Look, and Judge. Shinn also started displaying his paintings and pastels publicly in 1899 to mixed reactions. In 1900, he and Flossie traveled to Europe to allow him an opportunity to study other painters and to prepare to produce enough work for another exhibition. The trip influenced his art in years to come; he was especially taken with Impressionism and European art that focused on depictions of the theater.

Shinn has said of his experience at the Philadelphia Press:

"In the Art Department of the Philadelphia Press on wobbling, ink-stained drawing boards William J. Glackens, George Luks, Everett Shinn and John Sloan went to school, a school now lamentably extinct…a school that trained memory and quick perception."

It was during Shinn's time in Philadelphia that artists Robert Henri, John Sloan, and Joseph Laub established the Charcoal Club as an informal alternative art school. The group, which included Henri, Sloan, Shinn, and fellow illustrators and would-be painters like William Glackens and George Luks, reached a peak membership of thirty-eight and sketched nudes and critiqued of each other's work. The club, which was both ribaldly social and intellectual, is often thought of a point of origin for what became known as the Ashcan school of American art. To his friends and fellow artists, Henri (the elder statesman of the group) urged the study of Whitman, Emerson, Zola, and Ibsen and the need for painters to forge a new style of art that spoke more to their time and experience. He believed that younger artists should look to the modern city for their subject matter and paint in a freer, less academic style than art lovers of the time were accustomed to. It was an outlook with which Shinn readily agreed.

== New York and The Eight ==
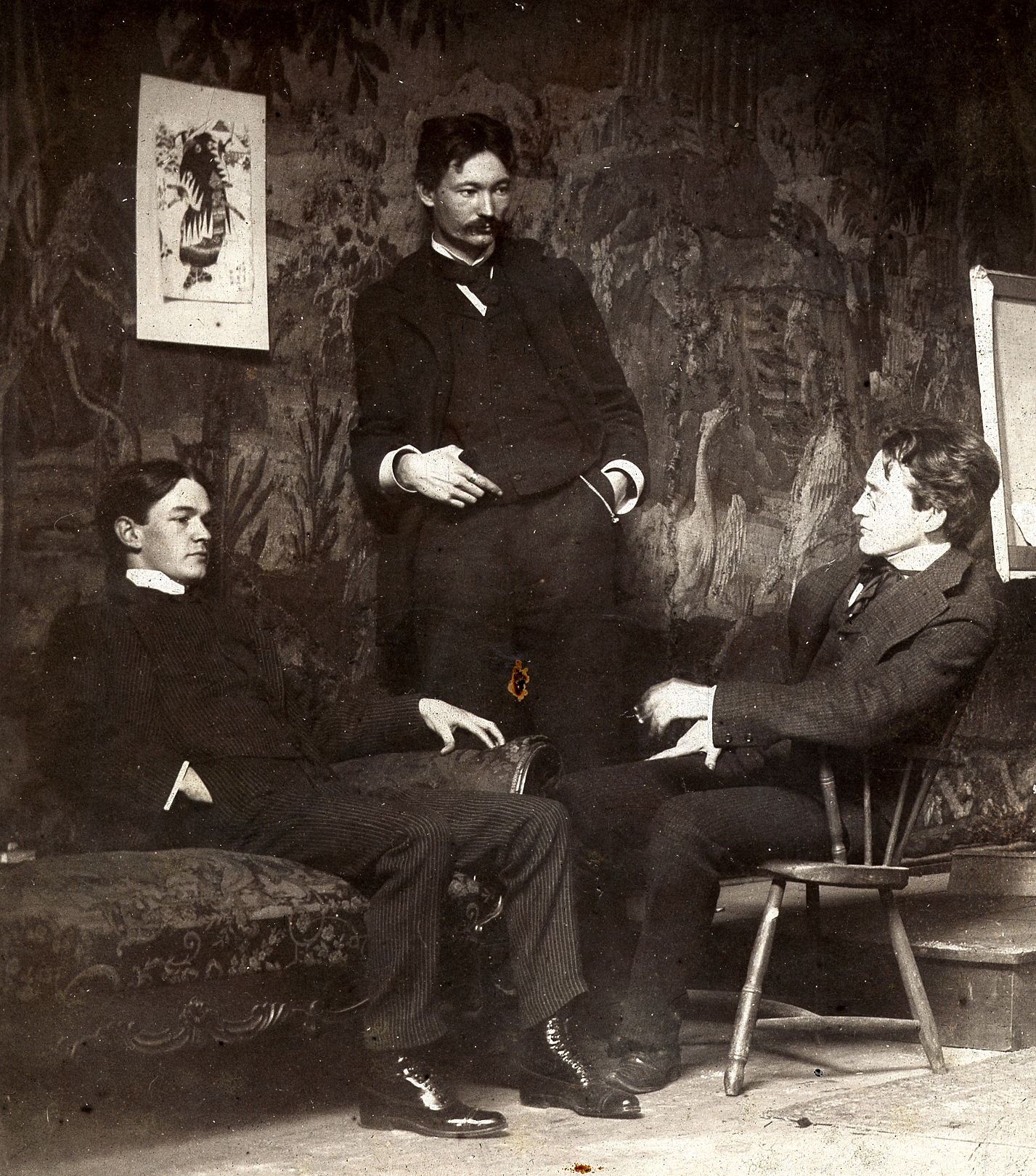
Ashcan School artists, circa 1896. L-R: Everett Shinn, Robert Henri, John Sloan

In 1897, Shinn was offered a higher paying job as an illustrator for Joseph Pulitzer's New York World. (Theodore Dreiser also worked for the World at that time.) He was joined shortly after by his wife, Flossie, and by other members of the Charcoal Club. Shinn enjoyed living in the city and observing the hustle and bustle of Manhattan. His fascination with the intensity of urban life is evident in paintings like Fire on Mott Street and Fight or in his renderings of election rallies and matinee crowds. Shinn had a particular interest in scenes of drama (accidents, buildings on fire) and street violence. His preferred medium at this time when not drawing for the newspaper was pastel, the medium least associated with the grittiness of his subject matter. He is the only Ashcan artist to produce a large body of work in pastel.

Shinn left no record or notes of any kind about his time in Europe, but it is generally assumed that he saw the work of Daumier, Degas, and Lautrec while in France and Walter Sickert while in England. Echoes of the style of all four artists can be found in Shinn's work, especially in the affinity he shares with Degas in depictions of stages marked by unusual croppings and compositions. Some of these paintings, like Trapeze, Winter Garden, New York (1903) or Curtain Call (n.d.), view the performers from the rear of the stage and include the audience as a backdrop to the picture itself; others, like London Hippodrome (1902), assume an imaginary aerial perspective from a balcony; and others take as a vantage point the middle of the orchestra pit (e..g, the 1906 The Orchestra Pit: Old Proctor's Fifth Avenue Theater), looking up toward the stage at a sharp angle. Whether depicting ballet dancers, magicians, actors, acrobats, or vaudevillians, Shinn (who presumably spent a good deal of time at the theater himself) presents performance art as an enlivening and sensuous, if sometimes raucous, experience for both the men and women on the stage and the audience.

Shinn became friendly with a number of major theater professionals in New York, including playwright Clyde Fitch, actress Julia Marlowe, and producer David Belasco. They were able to introduce him to a social elite in Manhattan that included interior designer Elsie de Wolfe and architect Stanford White. As a result, "Shinn did a number of murals for houses built by Stanford White and for many houses and apartments decorated by Elsie de Wolfe." His clients were usually interested in a Louis XVI style called "rococo revivalism." The ceilings and pianos in Clyde Fitch's apartments were also decorated by Shinn, and Fitch was happy to recommend his services to other wealthy acquaintances. It was a lucrative arrangement and a somewhat incongruous one for a man who also painted dock workers and brawling barflies. Shinn's most lasting contribution in this area, recently restored, are the murals he painted for Belasco's Stuyvesant Theatre (today the Belasco Theatre), which opened in 1907 and is still a prominent Broadway playhouse. About this space, one theater historian has written: "The rich walnut paneling, ornamental Tiffany lamps, and eighteen murals by Everett Shinn created a warm, comfortable setting for Belasco's standard mix of dazzling scenic effects and melodramatic hokum."

In February 1908, Shinn exhibited in a legendary exhibition at the Macbeth Galleries in New York that was intended as a protest against the conservative tastes and restrictive exhibition practices of the powerful National Academy of Design. The show, which also traveled to several cities from Newark to Chicago, occasioned considerable comment in the press about appropriate styles and content in art and gave the Ashcan painters more national publicity than they had previously enjoyed. The exhibiting artists, known as The Eight, included five realists (Shinn, Henri, Sloan, Glackens, and Luks) and three other artists (Arthur B. Davies, Ernest Lawson, Maurice Prendergast) who painted in a less realistic, more impressionistic style. Among the paintings Shinn chose to exhibit with The Eight was The London Hippodrome (1902), his most reproduced work and a painting that art historian Milton Brown called "among the best that the Ashcan school produced."

== Later life ==
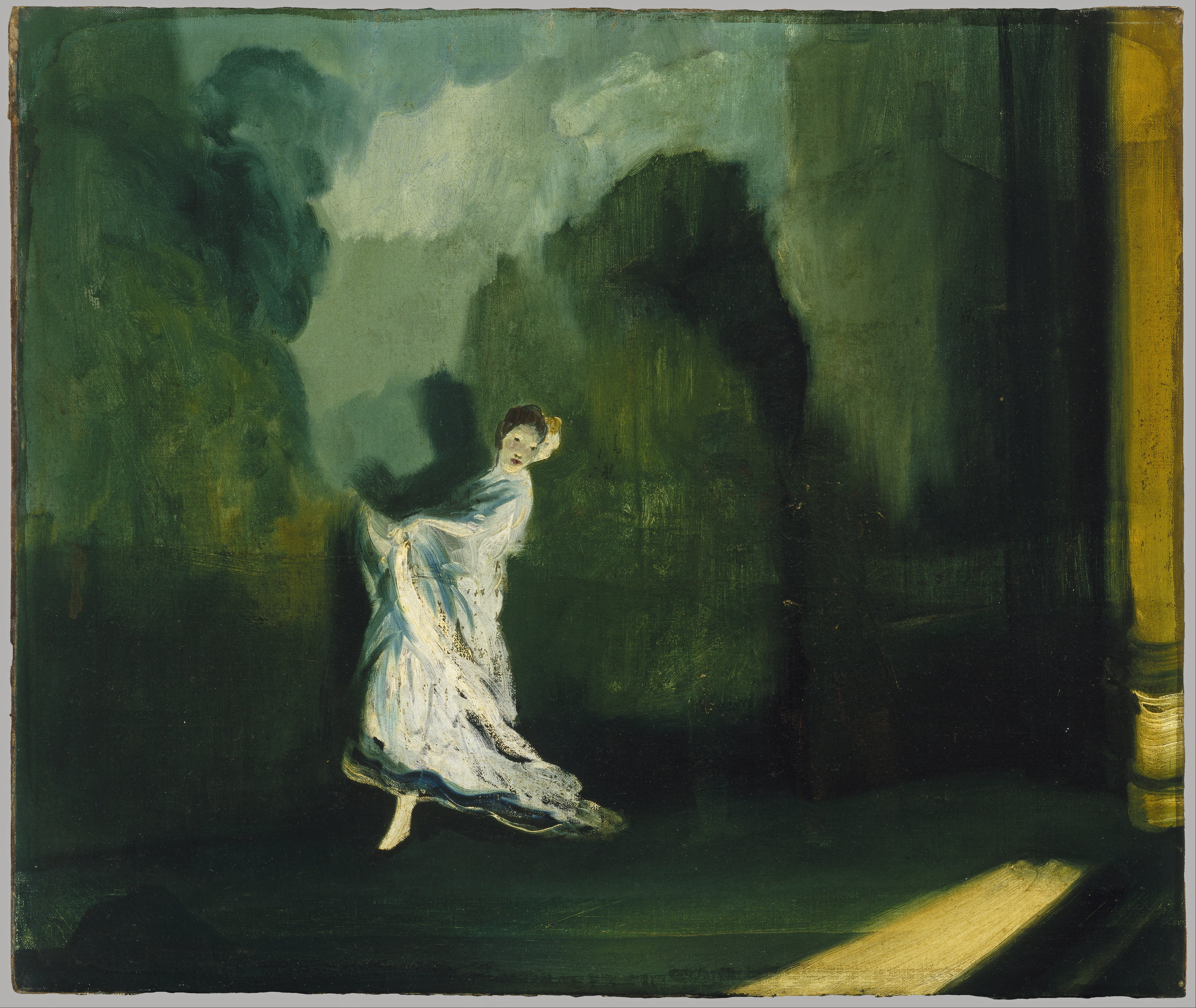
Keith's Union Square, ca. 1902–1906. Brooklyn Museum

Unlike the other members of The Eight, Shinn did not exhibit in the famous 1913 Armory Show of modern art and, in fact, became over the years a confirmed anti-Modernist, expressing nothing but disdain for Picasso and Matisse. He remained a representational artist all his life with no interest in stylistic experimentation, and throughout the 1910s and 1920s he cultivated a market for deftly-made drawings in the spirit of a latter-day Watteau or Boucher. This resistance to the changing era he was living in accounts, in part, for his declining place in art history after his death. His style, in the view of many observers, also took on a more facile, commercial quality, and some of his later works, like the murals painted for the bar of the Plaza Hotel, have an essentially nostalgic aim, reimagining in the 1940s the world of hansom cabs and city streets lighted by gas-lamps.

"Except for one exhibition at Knoedler's in 1920," his biographer writes, "Everett Shinn does not seem to have exhibited paintings between 1910 and 1937." (In 1937, Shinn was included in the Whitney Museum's "New York Realists" show, which was, in essence, a reunion of the major Ashcan painters now that their day had passed.) The 1940s saw his work included in more museum exhibitions, though, and just prior to his death he was taken on by the prestigious James Graham Gallery in New York. In his best years, Shinn was well-paid and owned large houses in Connecticut and Upstate New York, but he went through a vast amount of money (along with four wives and numerous mistresses) and was financially straitened in his final days. He died on May 1, 1953, in New York City.

== Legacy ==
Shinn was the youngest member of The Eight. Though his work is varied and resistant to easy categorization, it is considered most commonly in art histories in the context of The Eight and the Ashcan school, designations that do not quite fit the range of his individual vision.

Shinn's relations with other members of The Eight, most of whom remained friendly into their later years, were never strong. "He was an accidental member of The Eight", John Sloan remarked in the late 1940s when he cast a vote against Shinn's nomination for membership in the Institute of Arts and Letters. Shinn's commitment to the high life and to interior decoration rubbed a Socialist and true urban realist like Sloan the wrong way. Yet Shinn had never claimed for himself a political stance in his art or intended to narrow his interests in service to a movement or school of art. His best works effectively capture a slice of American urban life in the first years of the twentieth century, in both a realist and a romantic spirit, and his most ambitious paintings (The London Hippodrome, The Orchestra Pit: Old Proctor's Fifth Avenue Theater) are among the greatest theater-inspired images in American art.

== Gallery ==
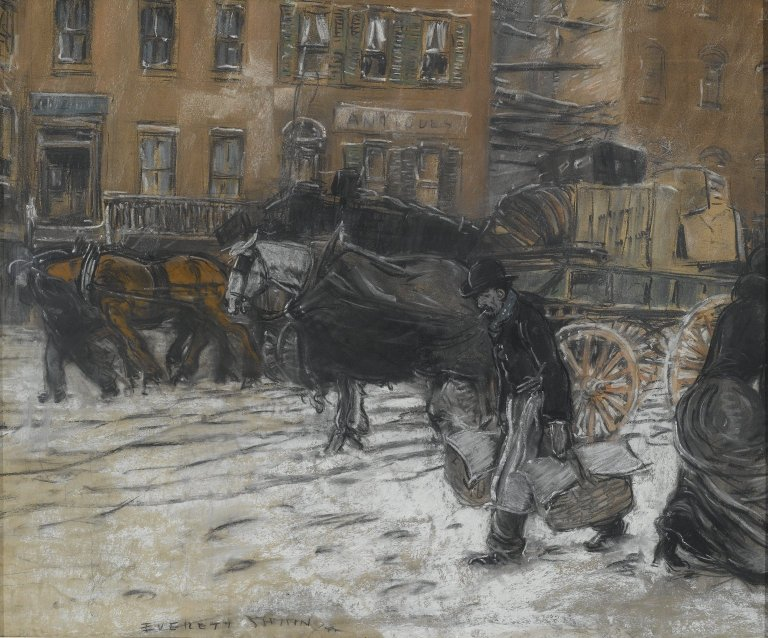
Winter on 21st Street, New York, 1899, Brooklyn Museum

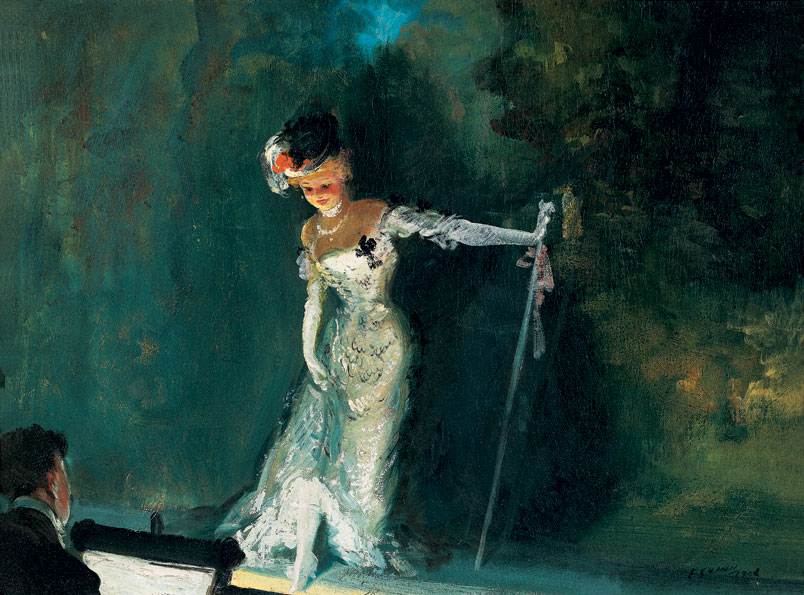
Revue, 1903

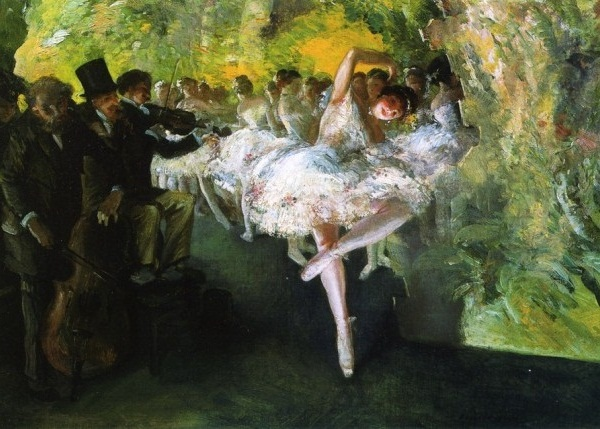
Rehearsal of the Ballet, 1903

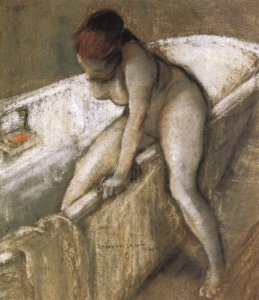
Girl in a Bathtub, 1903

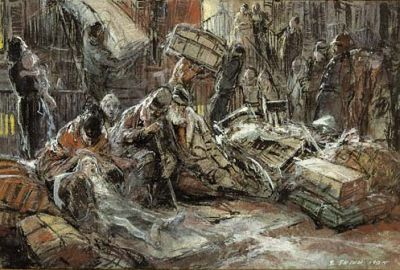
Eviction, 1904

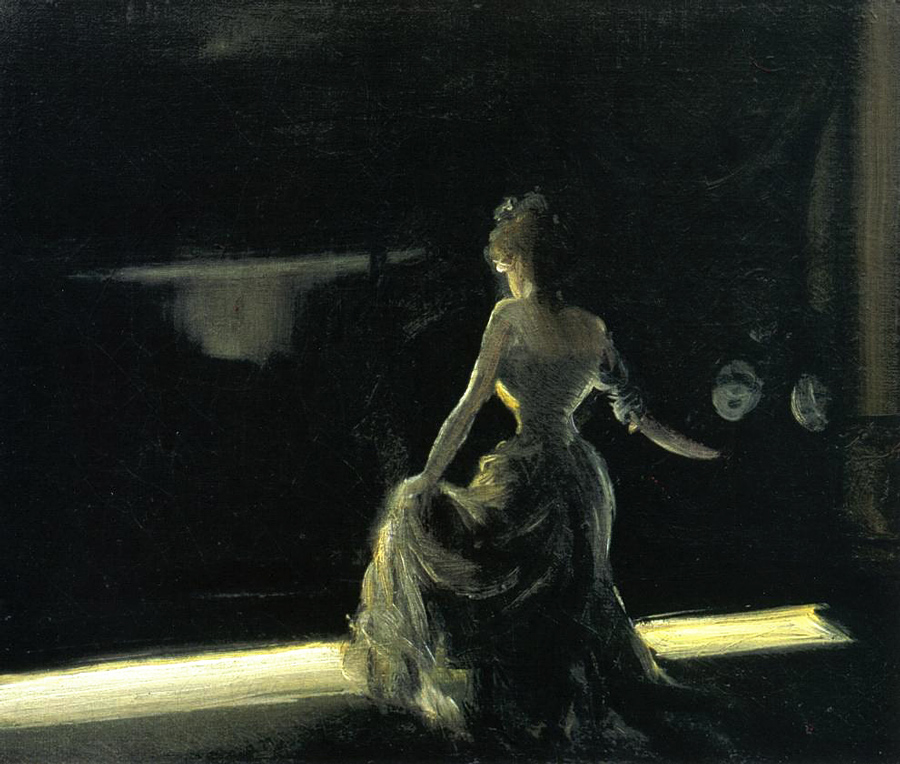
A girl on stage, 1906

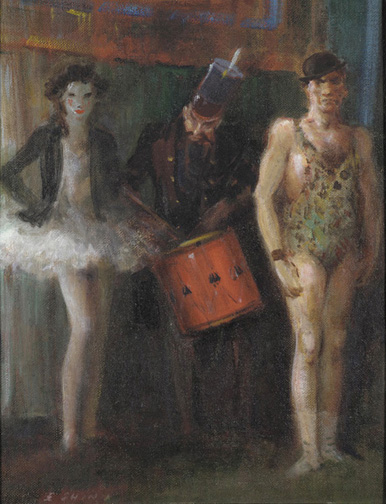
Strong Man, Clown and Dancer, 1909

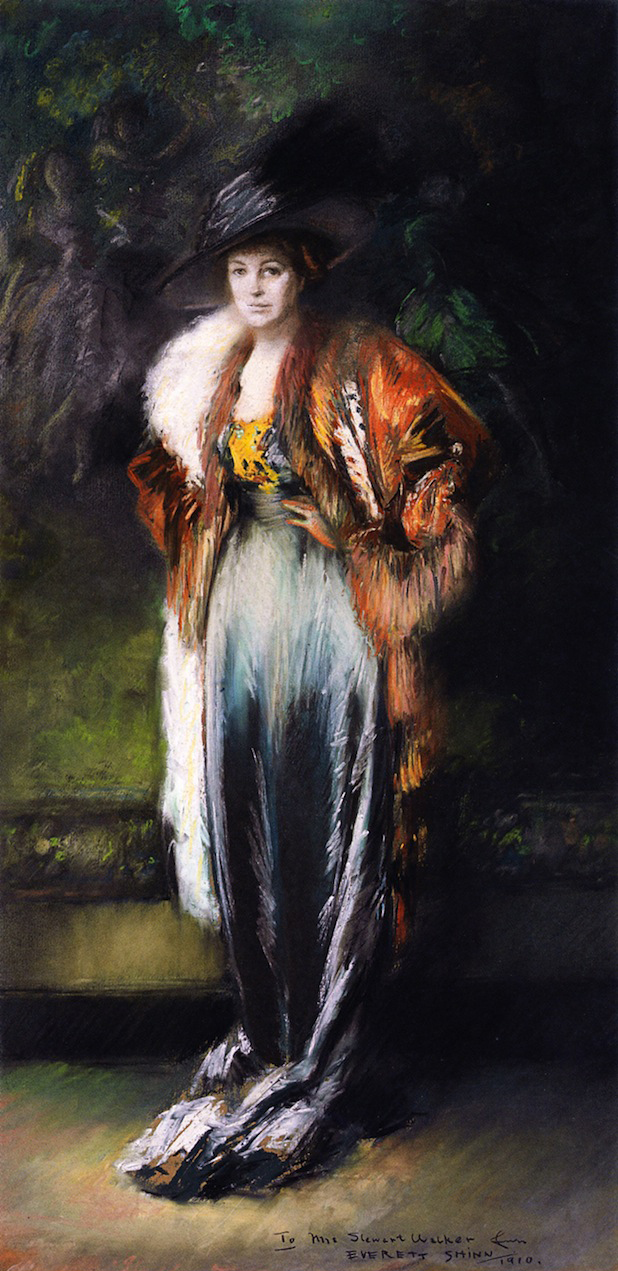
Mrs A Stewart Walker in a Fur, 1910

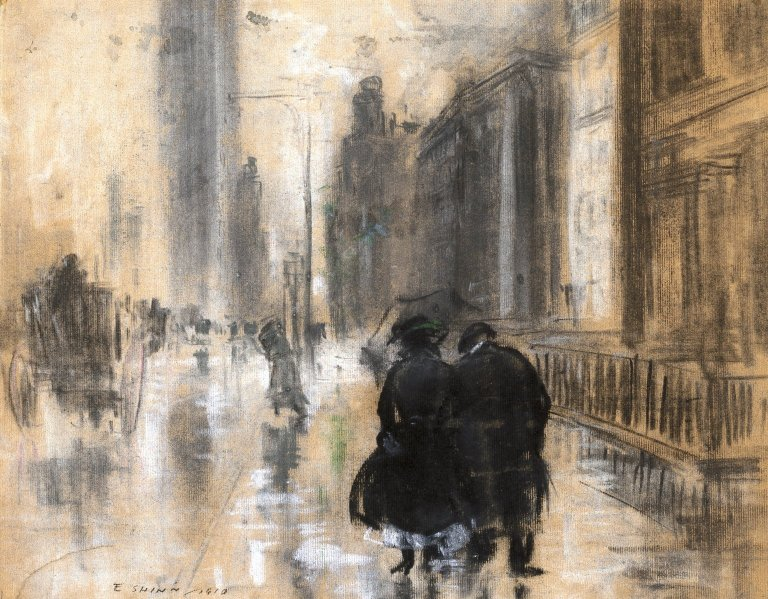
Fifth Avenue, 1910, Brooklyn Museum

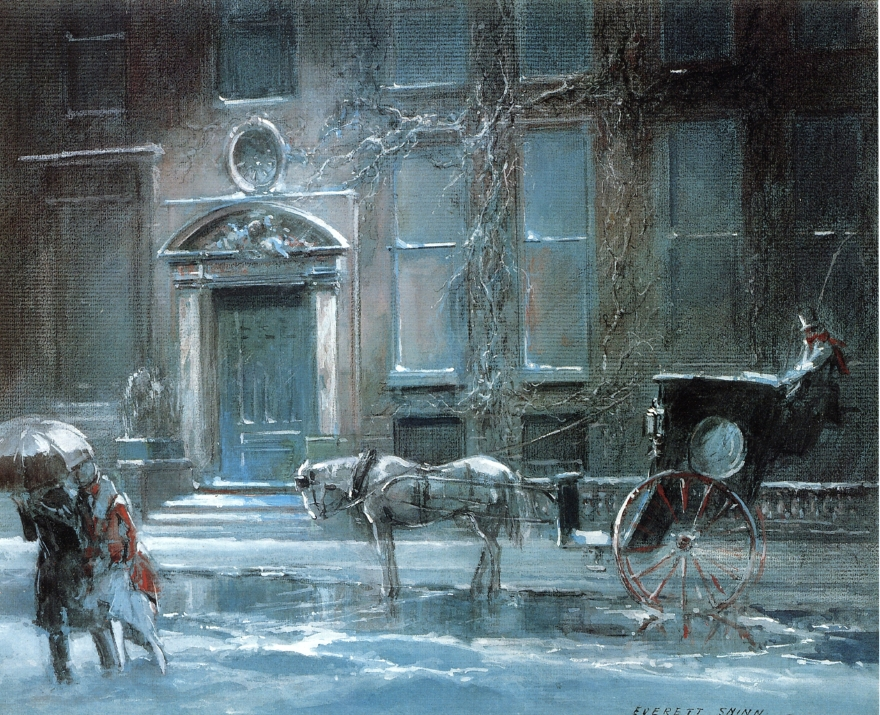
The Canfield Gambling House, 1912

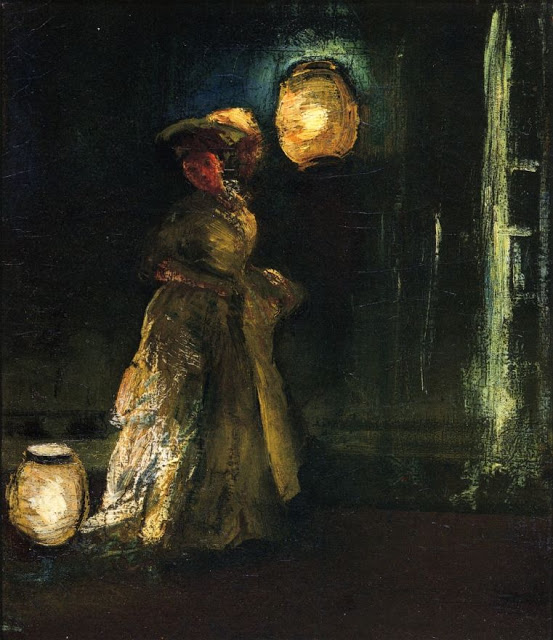
Girl with Japanese Lanterns, 1912

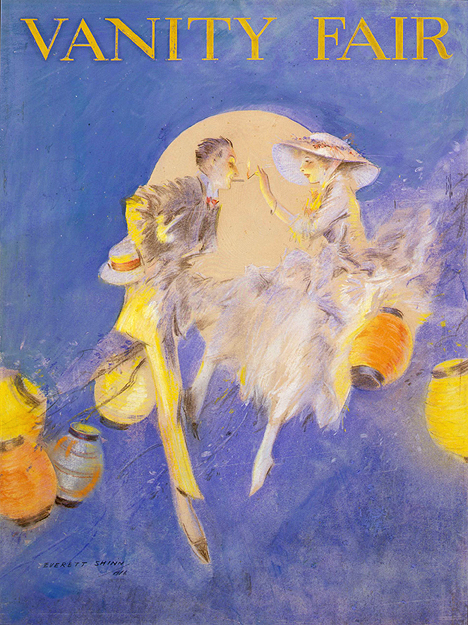
Couple Sitting Among Lanterns, Vanity Fair, June 1916

== Selected works ==
- Fifth Avenue Coach, Winter (1906): Montclair Art Museum
- Backstage Scene (1900): Delaware Art Museum
- Tenements at Hester Street (1900): The Phillips Collection, Washington, D.C.
- Self-Portrait (1901): National Portrait Gallery, Washington, D.C.
- The Hippodrome, London (1902): Art Institute of Chicago, Chicago
- The Vaudeville Act (1902–1903): Palmer Museum of Art at Pennsylvania State University
- Theater Scene (1903): Terra Foundation for the Arts, Chicago
- Outdoor Stage, France (1905): Fine Arts Museum of San Francisco
- A French Music Hall (1906): Crystal Bridges Museum of American Art, Bentonville, Arkansas
- The Orchestra Pit: Old Proctor's Fifth Avenue Theater (1906): Yale University Art Gallery
- Dancer in White Before the Footlights (1910): Butler Institute of American Art, Youngstown, Ohio
- Actress in Red Before Mirror (1910): Hunter Museum of American Art, Tennessee
- Trenton Mural (1911): City Council chambers, Trenton City Hall, Trenton, New Jersey
- Tightrope Walker (1924): Dayton Art Institute, Dayton, Ohio

== Selected exhibitions ==
- 1899, January 16–February 25: Pennsylvania Academy of the Fine Arts
- 1900, February 26–April 4: Boussod, Valadon & Co., New York [Shinn's first extensive one-man show]
- 1903, March 9–21: Knoedler & Co. New York
- 1903, April 24–June 1: Art Institute of Chicago
- 1904, March 2–16: Durand-Ruell Galleries, New York
- 1905–1906, November 20–January 1:Carnegie Institute, Pittsburgh
- 1907, January 21–February 2: Corcoran Gallery of Art, Washington, D.C.
- 1908, February: The Eight exhibition at the Macbeth Galleries, New York
- 1910, April: American Watercolor Society, New York
- 1920, June–August: Knoedler & Co., New York
- 1937, February 9–March 5: "New York Realists at the Whitney Museum of American Art
- 1944, Fall: Carnegie Institute, Pittsburgh
- 1946, November 19–December 7: American British Art Center
- 1950–1951, December 9–February 25: Metropolitan Museum of Art
- 1952, November: James Graham & Sons, New York

== See also ==
- American realism

== Sources ==
- Brown, Milton. American Painting from the Armory Show to the Depression. Princeton: Princeton University Press, 1955.
- De Shazo, Edith, Everett Shinn, 1876–1953: A Figure in His Time. New York: Clarkson N. Potter, 1974.
- Hunter, Sam. Modern American Painting and Sculpture. New York: Dell, 1959.
- Life's Pleasures: The Ashcan Artists' Brush with Leisure, 1895–1925 (exhibition catalogue for the Detroit Institute of Arts and the New York Historical Society). London: Merrill Publishers, 2007.
- Loughery, John. John Sloan: Painter and Rebel. New York: Henry Holt, 1995.
- Mazow, Leo G. "Everett Shinn's Time Warp" (pp. 129–137) in Elizabeth Kennedy (ed.), The Eight and American Modernisms. Chicago: University of Chicago Press, 1009.
- Metropolitan Lives: The Ashcan Artists and Their New York (exhibition catalogue). Washington, D.C.: the National Museum of American Art, 1996.
- Perlman, Bennard N. Painters of the Ashcan School: The Immortal Eight. New York: Dover, 1999 edition.
- Wong, Janay. Everett Shinn: The Spectacle of Life (exhibition catalogue). New York: Berry-Hill Galleries, 2000.
