= New York World comic strips =

The New York World was one of the first newspapers to publish comic strips, starting around 1890, and contributed greatly to the development of the American comic strip. Notable strips that originated with the World included Richard F. Outcault's Hogan's Alley, Rudolph Dirks' The Captain and the Kids, Denys Wortman's Everyday Movies, Fritzi Ritz, Gus Mager's Hawkshaw the Detective, Victor Forsythe's Joe Jinks, and Robert Moore Brinkerhoff's Little Mary Mixup.

Under the names World Feature Service and New York World Press Publishing the company also syndicated comic strips to other newspapers around the country from circa 1905 until the paper's demise in 1931.

== History ==
Joseph Pulitzer's New York World newspaper began publishing cartoons in 1889. A color Sunday humor supplement began to run in the World in Spring 1893. In 1894, the World published the first color strip, designed by Walt McDougall, showing that the technique already enabled this kind of publication. The supplement's editor Morrill Goddard contacted cartoonist Richard F. Outcault and offered Outcault a full-time position with the World. Outcault's Yellow Kid character made his debut in the World on January 13, 1895. The kid appeared in color for the first time in the May 5 issue in a cartoon titled "At the Circus in Hogan's Alley". Outcault weekly Hogan's Alley cartoons appeared from then on in color, starring rambunctious slum kids in the streets, in particular, the bald kid, who gained the name Mickey Dugan. The strip's popularity drove up the World's circulation and the Kid was widely merchandised. Outcault — and much of the World's Sunday supplement staff — left for William Randolph Hearst's New York Journal on October 18, 1896. George Luks took over with his own version of Hogan's Alley; but the Yellow Kid's popularity soon faded, and Luks' version ended in December 1897.

After Hogan's Alley, the World published a number of comic strips from the late 1890s until the paper's 1931 demise. The prolific cartoonist C. W. Kahles was responsible for numerous comic strips for the World. He is credited as the pioneer of daily comic strip continuity with his Clarence the Cop, which he drew for the World beginning in the latter 1890s. It introduced to newspapers the innovation of continuing a comic strip story in a day-to-day serial format, and is also considered to be the first police strip. Kahles' Sandy Highflyer, the Airship Man (1902–1904) is considered the first aviation comic strip. The cartoonist and comics historian Ernest McGee called Kahles the "hardest working cartoonist in history, having as many as eight Sunday comics running at one time (1905-1906) with no assistants to help him."

Clare Victor Dwiggins joined the World in 1897. He created a wide variety of gag panels. In 1904, after winning $3,000 at the racetrack, cartoonist George McManus went to New York City and a job with the World, where he worked on several short-lived comic strips. One of them, The Newlyweds (later renamed Their Only Child) is considered one of the first comic strips to depict the lives of the typical American family. Gene Carr and Milt Gross were also notable for the number of their comic strips published and distributed by the World.

Beginning in about 1905, the company began syndicating strips to other newspapers under the name World Feature Service; in circa 1910 it added the syndication division New York World Press Publishing (also known as Press Publishing Co.).

Many notable cartoonists were on staff at various times at the paper, including Charles W. Saalburg, V. Floyd Campbell, Richard F. Outcault, Walt McDougall, George Herriman, Harry Grant Dart, J. Campbell Cory, George Luks, Clare Victor Dwiggins, C. W. Kahles, Carl Thomas Anderson, Charles A. Voight, Jack Callahan, Frank Fogarty, Walter Berndt, George McManus, Leslie Turner, Harry Haenigsen, and Percy Crosby. In the early 1900s the World was known as "the promised land for aspiring cartoonists." Charles Saalburg was chief of the color department during the heyday of the Yellow Kid. Harry Grant Dart eventually rose to become the World's art editor, followed by Al Smith, who was the art editor for the syndication department from 1920 to 1930.

After a series of legal battles between 1912 and 1914, Rudolph Dirks, creator of the hugely popular The Katzenjammer Kids strip, left the Hearst organization for Pulitzer and began a new strip, first titled Hans and Fritz and then The Captain and the Kids. It featured the same characters seen in The Katzenjammer Kids, and remained nearly as popular (eventually running until 1979).

The E. W. Scripps Company acquired the New York World newspaper and its syndication assets in February 1931, bringing over to Scripps' United Feature Syndicate the popular comic strips The Captain and the Kids, Everyday Movies, Fritzi Ritz, Hawkshaw the Detective, Joe Jinks, and Little Mary Mixup.

== New York World comic strips and panels ==
- Carl Thomas Anderson:
  - The Filipino and the Chick (launched 1898, 1903; moved to the New York Journal)
- Robert Moore Brinkerhof:
  - All in the Family (launched in 1930; moved in 1933 to United Feature Syndicate, where it ran until 1935)
  - Little Mary Mixup (launched 1917; moved to United Features in 1931 where in ran until 1956)
- Jack Callahan:
  - Flivvers (1916–1917)
  - Midweek Movies (1910–1919)
  - Pictorial History of Bugville (1913)
  - When You Were a Boy (1916–1917)
- Gene Carr:
  - Bill and the Jones Boys (1905) — Sunday strip
  - Buddy's Baby Sister (1913) — Sunday strip
  - Dearie (1910) — Sunday strip
  - Duddy's Baby Sister (1913) — Sunday strip
  - Everyday Movies (1921–1924; strip taken over by Denys Wortman) — gag panel
  - Home Sweet Home (1907–1908) — Sunday strip
  - Kitty Kildare (1921)
  - Lady Bountiful (1903–1905, 1915–1918) — came over from the Hearst Syndicate, where it had been launched in 1902
  - Little Darling (1920–1921)
  - Major Stuff (1914–1915) — Sunday strip
  - Mr. Al Most (1911-1912) — Sunday strip
  - Pansy's Pal (1920)
  - Phyllis (1903-1906) — Sunday strip
  - Poor Mr. W (1917–1920)
  - The Prodigal Son (1906–1907) — Sunday strip
  - Reddy and Caruso (1907) — Sunday strip
  - Romeo (1905-1907) — Sunday strip
  - Step-Brothers (1907-1914) — Sunday strip
- Harry Grant Dart:
  - Boys Will Be Boys (1909)
  - The Explorigator (1908)
  - Life and Judge (1910s – 1920s)
- William Wallace Denslow:
  - Billy Bounce (1901-1905, 1908-1911) originally by Denslow, then by C. W. Kahles
- Rudolph Dirks:
  - The Captain and the Kids (launched 1914; moved to United Features in 1931 where in ran until 1979)
- Clare Victor Dwiggins:
  - J. Filliken Wilberfloss
  - Leap Year Lizzie, Ain't She Bizzy? (1912)
  - Makin' Believe (1912–1913)
  - Ophelia and Her Slate (1909–1911)
  - Pip Gint (1911)
  - Them Was the Happy Days (1911–1912)
- Victor Forsythe:
  - The Great White Dope
  - Joe's Car (later became Joe's Jinks) (launched 1918; moved to United Features in 1931 where in ran until 1953 under a succession of different titles)
  - Tenderfoot Tim (1913–1914)
- Milt Gross:
  - Babbling Brooks (1922–1923, 1930–1931)
  - Banana Oil (1923–1927; later known as Gross Exaggerations, The Feitelbaum Family, and Looy Dot Dope; lasted until at least 1930)
  - Bimbo (1922)
  - Count Screwloose of Tooloose (1929-1930; moved to King Features Syndicate, where it ran until 1945)
  - Hitz and Mrs. (1923)
  - Looy Dot Dope (1926–1938) originally by Gross, later by Bernard Dibble and John Devlin
  - Nize Baby (1926–1929)
  - Toy Town Tots (1923) — Sunday strip
- Harry Haenigsen:
  - Simeon Batts (1922–1931; moved to the New York American)
- A. E. Hayward:
  - Great Ceasar's Ghost (later named Great Ceasar's Goat and then Pinheads (1913–1915)
  - Some Day, Maybe (launched 1912)
- C. W. Kahles:
  - Billy Brag (launched 1905)
  - Butch the Bully (1903)
  - Clarence the Cop (launched late 1890s)
  - Clumsy Claude (1910–1916)
  - Doubting Thomas (1905–1909); later taken over by Myer Marcus
  - Foolish Fred (September 25 – December 11, 1904)
  - Fun in the Zoo (launched 1905)
  - The Funny Side Gang (launched 1906)
  - The Kelly Kids — later taken over by Nate Collier (1918–1920)
  - The Little Red Schoolhouse
  - The Merry Nobles Three—They Can Never Agree (1906)
  - Mr. and Mrs. Butt-in (1903)
  - Optimistic Oswald
  - Our Hero's Hairbreadth Escapes (launched 1906)
  - The Perils of Submarine Boating
  - Pretending Percy (1904)
  - Sandy Highflyer, the Airship Man (1902–1904)
  - The Teasers (1902–1906, 1908–1911)
  - Terrible Twins (launched 1905)
- Violet Higgins:
  - Drowsy Duck (1926–1927)
- Gus Jud:
  - Little Dave (1930–1932)
- Gus Mager:
  - Hawkshaw the Detective (originally known as Sherlocko the Monk) (1913–1922, relaunched in 1932; moved to United Features and ended in 1933) originally by Mager, later by Milt Gross, later still by Bernard Dibble — Sunday strip
  - Main Street (launched 1928)
- George McManus:
  - Cheerful Charlie (launched c. 1904–c. 1916) — later taken over by Harry Grant Dart
  - Let George Do It (later known as Let Bill Do It) (1910–1911) — later made into a Broadway musical
  - The Merry Marcelene
  - The Newlyweds (later renamed Their Only Child) (1904–1912; moved to the New York American where it ended in 1916)
  - Nibsby the Newsboy in Funny Fairyland (1906)
  - Panhandle Pete (1908)
  - Ready Money Ladies
  - Snoozer
- Otto Messmer:
  - Fun
- Art Nugent:
  - Puzzlers (1927–c. 1931)
- Richard F. Outcault
  - Casey’s Corner (launched February 13, 1898; and moved to the New York Evening Journal on April 8, 1898) — one of the first newspaper strips to feature continuity
  - Hogan's Alley (1895–1897)
- C. M. Payne:
  - Little Sammy (1914–1915)
  - Mr. Mush (later called Honeybunch's Hubby) (launched 1909)
- Eleanor Schorer:
  - The Adventures of Judy (April 13 – October 23, 1926)
  - Bessie and Bobbie In Search of Fairyland
  - Getting Ahead as a Business Girl — comic strip biographies of successful businesswomen; later work done by Betty Vincent
  - Her Dreams At Eighteen (1911)
  - Kiddie Klub (early 1920s)
  - The Land of Make Believe (1908–1909)
  - The Summer Girl (1912)
- Al Smith:
  - From Nine to Five (launched in 1920; moved to United Features in 1932 and ended in 1933)
- H. T. Webster:
  - The Man in the Brown Derby (1924–1925)
  - The Timid Soul (c. 1925–1931; moved to the New York Herald Tribune Syndicate, where it lasted until 1953) — evolved out of The Man in the Brown Derby
- Larry Whittington:
  - Fritzi Ritz, originally by Whittington; later by Ernie Bushmiller (launched 1922; moved to United Features in 1931 where it ran until 1968)
- Denys Wortman:
  - Everyday Movies (also known as Metropolitan Movies) (taken over from Gene Carr in 1924; moved to United Features in 1931, where it ran until 1954) — gag panel
