= List of artists in the Armory Show =

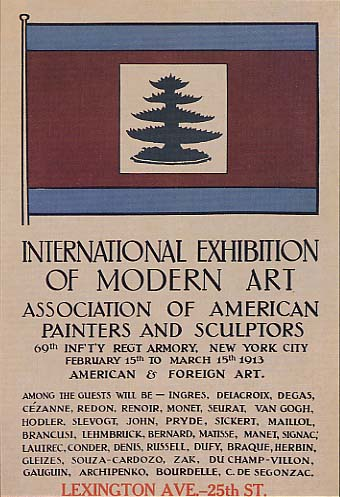
Armory Show poster. 1913.

The 1913 Armory Show contained approximately 1,300 works by 300 artists. Many of the original works have been lost and some of the artists have been forgotten. The list of artists in the Armory Show, while not complete, includes nearly all the artists from the United States and Europe who were exhibited in the Armory Show of 1913. The list is largely drawn from the catalog of the 1963 exhibition, 1913 Armory Show 50th Anniversary Exhibition, organized by the Munson-Williams-Proctor Arts Institute. Many exhibitions have been held in the vast spaces of U.S. National Guard armories, but the Armory Show refers to the International Exhibition of Modern Art that was organized by the Association of American Painters and Sculptors and opened in New York City's 69th Regiment Armory, on Lexington Avenue between 25th and 26th Streets, on February 17, 1913, and ran to March 15. It became a legendary watershed event in the history of American art, introducing astonished New Yorkers, accustomed to realistic art, to modern art. The show served as a catalyst for American artists, who became more independent and created their own artistic language.

== Artists ==
These artists are all listed in the 50th anniversary catalog as having exhibited in the original 1913 Armory show.

- Robert Ingersoll Aitken
- Alexander Archipenko
- George Grey Barnard
- Chester Beach
- Gifford Beal (Note: Two works catalogued but not received)
- Maurice Becker
- George Bellows
- Joseph Bernard
- Guy Pène du Bois
- Oscar Bluemner
- Pierre Bonnard
- Gutzon Borglum
- Antoine Bourdelle
- Constantin Brâncuși
- Georges Braque
- Patrick Henry Bruce
- Paul Burlin
- Theodore Earl Butler
- Charles Camoin
- Arthur Carles
- Mary Cassatt
- Oscar Cesare
- Paul Cézanne
- Pierre Puvis de Chavannes
- Camille Corot
- Gustave Courbet
- Henri-Edmond Cross
- Leon Dabo
- Andrew Dasburg
- Honoré Daumier
- Jo Davidson
- Arthur B. Davies
- Stuart Davis
- Edgar Degas
- Eugène Delacroix
- Robert Delaunay
- Maurice Denis
- André Derain
- Marcel Duchamp
- Raoul Dufy
- Jacob Epstein
- Roger de La Fresnaye
- Othon Friesz
- Paul Gauguin
- William Glackens
- Albert Gleizes
- Vincent van Gogh
- Francisco Goya
- Charles-François-Prosper Guérin
- Marsden Hartley
- Childe Hassam
- Robert Henri
- Edward Hopper
- Ferdinand Hodler
- Jean Auguste Dominique Ingres
- James Dickson Innes
- Augustus John
- Wassily Kandinsky
- Ernst Ludwig Kirchner
- Leon Kroll
- Walt Kuhn
- Gaston Lachaise
- Marie Laurencin
- Ernest Lawson
- Henri de Toulouse-Lautrec
- Derwent Lees
- Fernand Léger
- Jonas Lie
- George Luks
- Aristide Maillol
- Édouard Manet
- Henri Manguin
- John Marin
- Albert Marquet
- Henri Matisse
- Alfred Henry Maurer
- Kenneth Hayes Miller
- Claude Monet
- Adolphe Monticelli
- Edvard Munch
- Elie Nadelman
- Walter Pach
- Jules Pascin
- Francis Picabia
- Pablo Picasso
- Camille Pissarro
- Maurice Prendergast
- Odilon Redon
- Pierre-Auguste Renoir
- Boardman Robinson
- Theodore Robinson
- Auguste Rodin
- Georges Rouault
- Henri Rousseau
- Morgan Russell
- Albert Pinkham Ryder
- André Dunoyer de Segonzac
- Georges Seurat
- Charles Sheeler
- Walter Sickert
- Paul Signac
- Alfred Sisley
- John Sloan
- Amadeo de Souza Cardoso
- Joseph Stella
- John Henry Twachtman
- Félix Vallotton
- Raymond Duchamp-Villon
- Jacques Villon
- Maurice de Vlaminck
- Édouard Vuillard
- Abraham Walkowitz
- J. Alden Weir
- James Abbott McNeill Whistler
- Jack B. Yeats
- Marguerite Zorach
- William Zorach

== More artists ==
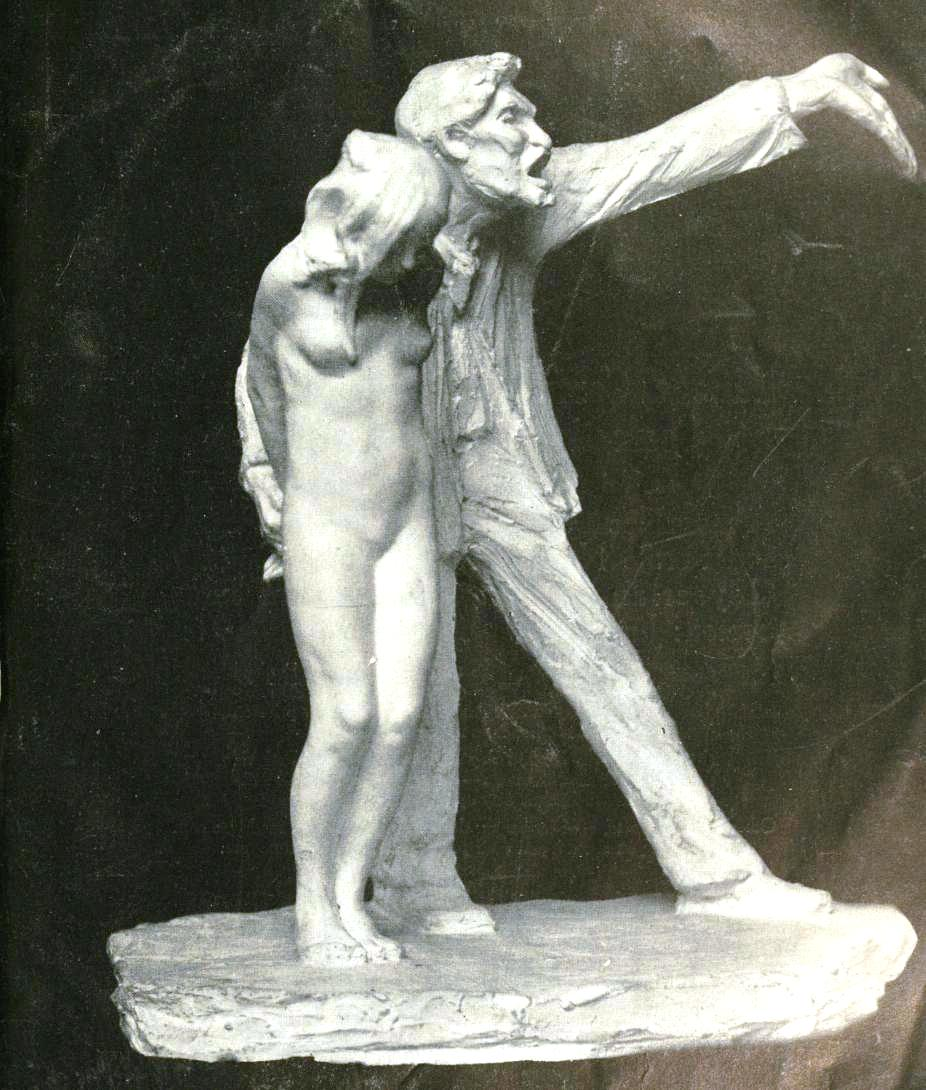
Abastenia St. Leger Eberle, The White Slave, c.1913

These artists are listed in the 50th anniversary catalog and in The Story of the Armory Show as having exhibited in the original 1913 Armory show.

- Albert Abendschein
- John H. Alger
- Karl Anderson
- Edmund Marion Ashe
- Florence Howell Barkley
- Wladimir von Bechtejeff
- Marion H. Beckett
- Nelson N. Bickford
- Olaf Bjorkman
- Alexandre Blanchet
- Hans Bolz
- Homer Boss
- Bessie Marsh Brewer
- D. Putnam Brinley
- Bolton Brown
- Fannie Miller Brown
- Edith Woodman Burroughs
- Auguste Chabaud
- Oliver Newberry Chaffee
- Robert Winthrop Chanler
- Émilie Charmy
- Amos Chew
- Alfred Vance Churchill
- Gustave Cimiotti, Jr.
- Edwin S. Clymer (Note: Work catalogued but not received)
- Harry W. Coate
- Nessa Cohen
- Glenn O. Coleman
- Howard Coluzzi (Note: Work catalogued but not received)
- Charles Conder
- Kate Cory
- Arthur Crisp
- Herbert Crowley
- J. Frank Currier
- Carl Gordon Cutler
- Randall Davey
- Charles Harold Davis
- Edith Dimock
- Rudolph Dirks
- Nathaniel Dolinsky
- Gaines Ruger Donoho
- Henri-Lucien Doucet
- Katherine S. Dreier
- Aileen King Dresser
- Lawrence Tyler Dresser
- Florence Dreyfous
- Richard H. Duffy
- Georges Dufrénoy
- Abastenia St. Leger Eberle
- Henry B. Eddy
- Amos W. Engle
- Florence Esté
- Lily Abbott Everett
- Jules Flandrin
- Mary Foote
- James Earle Fraser
- Kenneth Frazier
- Arthur Ernest Freund
- Sherry E. Fry (Note: Work catalogued but not received)
- Ernest Fuhr
- Samuel Wood Gaylor
- Phelan Gibb
- Wilhelm Gimmi
- Pierre Girieud
- Henry J. Glintenkamp
- Anne Goldthwaite
- Charles Guérin
- Bernard Gussow
- Bernhard Gutmann
- Philip Leslie Hale
- Samuel Halpert
- Charles R. Harley
- Edith Haworth
- Walter Helbig
- Julius Hess
- Eugene Higgins
- Margaret Hoard
- Nathaniel Hone
- Charles Hopkinson
- Cecil de Blaquiere Howard
- Albert Humphreys
- Mrs. Thomas Hunt
- Margaret Wendell Huntington
- Franz M. Jansen
- Gwen John
- Grace Mott Johnson
- Julius Paul Junghanns
- Bernard Karfiol
- Henry Keller
- Edith L. King
- Alfred Kirstein
- Adolph Kleiminger
- Hermine E. Kleinert
- Edward Adam Kramer
- Pierre Laprade
- Arthur Lee
- Derwent Lees
- Wilhelm Lehmbruck
- Rudolf Levy
- Amy Londoner
- August Frederick Lundberg
- Dodge MacKnight
- Elmer Livingston MacRae
- Gus Mager
- Edward Middleton Manigault
- Matthijs Maris
- Manuel Martinez Hugué
- Jacqueline Marval
- Carolyn Mase
- Max Mayrshofer
- Francis McComas
- Kathleen McEnery
- Howard McLean
- Charlotte Meltzer
- Oscar Miestchanioff
- David Brown Milne
- John Frederick Mowbray-Clarke
- Henry Muhrman
- Hermann Dudley Murphy
- Myra Musselmann-Carr
- Ethel Myers
- Jerome Myers
- Frank Arthur Nankivell
- Helen J. Niles
- Olga Oppenheimer
- Marjorie Organ
- Josephine Paddock
- Agnes Lawrence Pelton
- Charles H. Pepper
- Van Dearing Perrine
- Harriet Sophia Phillips
- Anastasio Pietro
- Walter K. Pleuthner
- Louise Pope
- Louis Potter (Note: Work catalogued but not received)
- Thomas E. Powers (Note: Two landscapes were catalogued for T. E. Powers (1870–1939) but were not received.)
- James Moore Preston
- May Wilson Preston
- James Pryde
- Arthur Putnam
- Bertrand Rasmussen
- Henry Reuterdahl
- Katharine Rhoades
- Dr. William Rimmer
- Mary Rogers
- Paul Rohland
- Jules Edouard Roiné
- Edward F. Rook
- Ker-Xavier Roussel
- Charles Cary Rumsey
- George W. Russell
- Victor D. Salvatore
- Morton L. Schamberg
- William E. Schumacher
- Charles-Emmanuel Serret
- Julius Seyler
- Charles Shannon
- Sidney Dale Shaw
- Max Slevogt
- Carl Sprinchorn
- Wilson Steer
- Frances Simpson Stevens
- Morgan Stinemetz
- Nicolai A. Tarchov
- Henry Fitch Taylor
- William L. Taylor
- Felix E. Tobeen
- Gaston Toussaint
- Allen Tucker
- J. Alden Twachtman
- Bessie Potter Vonnoh
- F. M. Walts
- Hilda Ward
- Alexander L. Warshawsky
- F. William Weber
- E. Ambrose Webster
- Friedrich August Weinzheimer
- Albert Weisgerber (Note: Work promised but not received)
- Julius Wentscher, Jr.
- Charles Henry White
- Claggett Wilson
- Denys Wortman
- Enid Yandell
- Arthur Young
- Mahonri Young
- Eugène Zak

== See also ==
- List of women artists in the Armory Show
