= Hawkshaw the Detective =

Comic strip character

- Launch date: (1st run) February 23, 1913 (2nd run) December 13, 1931
- End date: (1st run) November 12, 1922 (2nd run) 1952
- Alternate name: Sherlocko the Monk
- Syndicate(s): World Feature Service (1913–1932); United Feature Syndicate (1933–1952)

Gus Mager's Hawkshaw the Detective (November 23, 1947)

Hawkshaw the Detective was a comic strip character featured in an eponymous cartoon serial by Gus Mager from February 23, 1913, to November 12, 1922, and again from December 13, 1931, to 1952. (The revival was a topper to The Captain and the Kids.) The name of Mager's character was derived from the common American slang of the time, in which a hawkshaw meant a detective—that slang itself derived from playwright Tom Taylor's use of the name for the detective in his 1863 stage play The Ticket of Leave Man.

== Characters and story ==
=== Sherlocko ===
Hawkshaw the Detective was based on one of Mager's "monk" characters (so called because they looked a lot like monkeys), "Sherlocko the Monk," who made his first appearance in 1910. That name was scrapped after Arthur Conan Doyle, the creator of Sherlock Holmes, threatened legal action over the parodied name. (Sherlocko's bumbling partner Watso did not survive the renaming, either; he became "The Colonel.")

Sherlocko used careful examination of clues and his knowledge of human nature to solve the crimes. Almost invariably they were done by some other "monk" character in the course of his regular activities (Groucho, Forgetto, Henpecko, Nervo ...). On 12-1-1911, a genuine criminal, Black Pete, makes his first appearance.

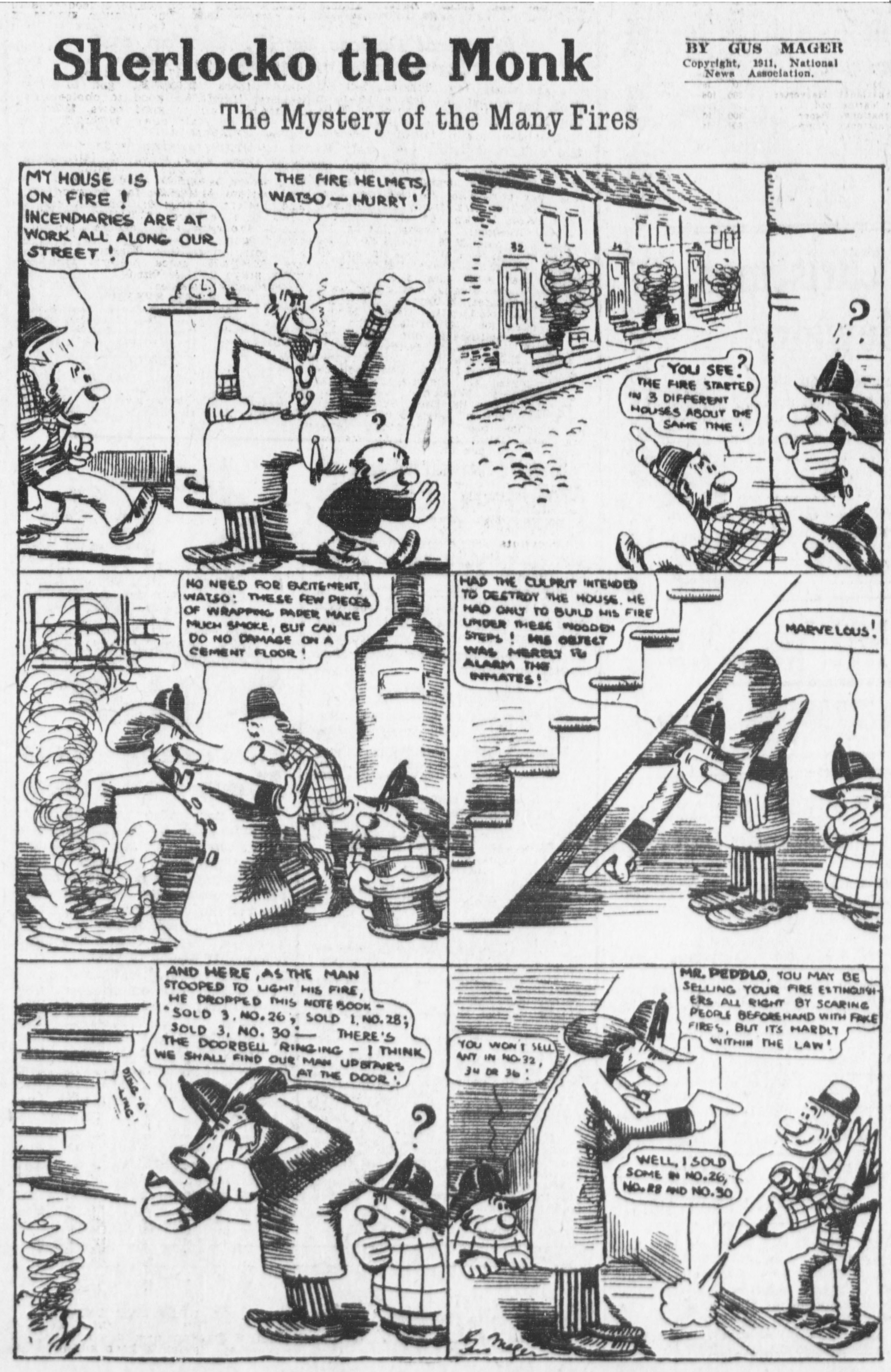
In this 1911 strip, Sherlocko solved the Mystery of the Many Fires

=== Knocko ===
==== Groucho ====
An earlier version of Sherlocko, entitled Knocko the Monk, spawned a fad of nicknames ending in O, which prompted a vaudeville monologist named Art Fisher, while playing poker with four brothers who performed together, to give them all such names. One of the brothers got a name that belonged to one of the characters in the strip: Groucho, one of the monks. Fisher named the other brothers Harpo, Chicko (later re-spelled "Chico") and Gummo. At various times, however, the different Marx Brothers provided different reasons for the names, so Knocko the Monk may not, in fact, have been the inspiration.

=== Hawkshaw ===
Hawkshaw the Detective, played originally by Horace Wigan, debuted in the 1863 play of Tom Taylor, The Ticket of Leave Man. His character was taken up by the New York World on February 23, 1913, and continued for many years in various Pulitzer-owned newspapers. In 1917, some of Hawkshaw and the Colonel's newspaper antics were republished in book form by the Saalfield Company.

== In popular culture ==
In 1912, the comic strip was adapted in two live-action comedy films, The Robbery at the Railroad Station and The Henpeckos.

The character was also referenced in two of Dorothy L. Sayers' Lord Peter Wimsey novels: Unnatural Death (1927) and Busman's Honeymoon (1937).

== Robert E. Howard ==
Included amongst Robert E. Howard's earliest published works were three stories featuring Hawkshaw the Detective and the Colonel.
