= Little Mary Mixup =

American comic strip by Robert Brinkerhoff

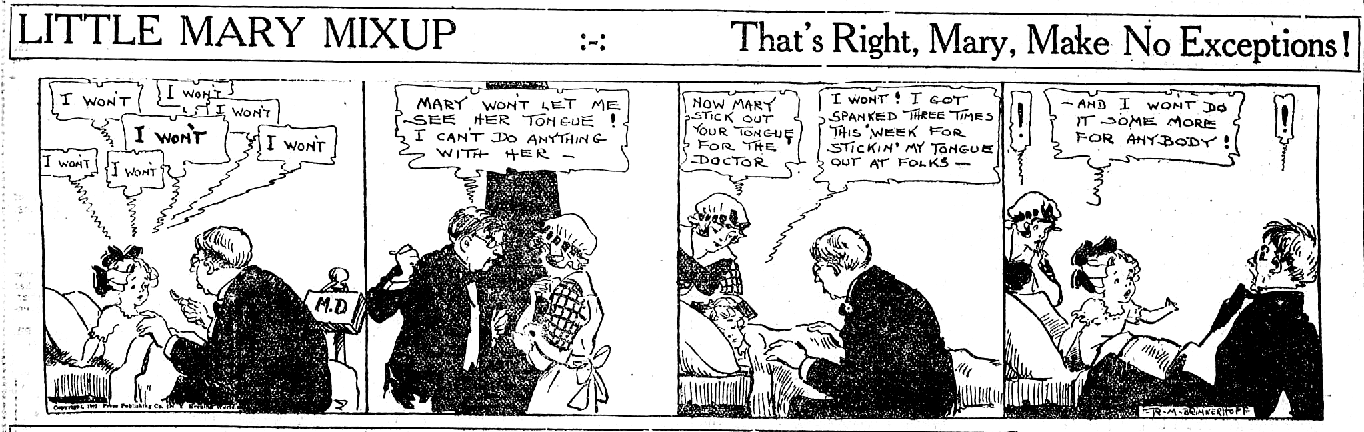
- Little Mary Mixup comic strip from 1919. Mary goes to the doctor.
- Author: Robert Moore Brinkerhoff
- Current status/schedule: Concluded daily & Sunday strip
- Launch date: January 2, 1918
- End date: February 2, 1957
- Syndicate(s): Press Publishing (New York World) (1918–1931); World Feature Service (1931–1932); United Feature Syndicate (1933–1957)
- Genre(s): gag-a-day, adventure

Little Mary Mixup was an American comic strip drawn by Robert Moore Brinkerhoff (1880–1958), which ran from January 2, 1918, to February 2, 1957.

== History ==
Little Mary Mixup debuted as a gag-a-day strip featuring a mischievous nine-year-old girl. However, Mary aged slowly over time, and by World War II, she was an adventurous teenager who could participate in the war. By then, Little Mary Mixup had developed from a gag strip into an adventure strip that involved kidnappers, crooks, and a treasure hunt. However, the Sunday strips were separated from the daily continuity and continued to feature simple gags.

The Sunday page also had a topper strip, All in the Family, drawn by Brinkerhoff. The topper ran from April 3, 1932, to July 21, 1940.

The strip was distributed by Press Publishing (New York World) (1918–1931), World Feature Service (1931–1932) and United Feature Syndicate (1933–1957).

The strip appeared in 143 mostly minor newspapers. It ended in 1957, when Brinkerhoff retired.
