= Cléanthe Carr =

American cartoonist and illustrator (1911–2001)

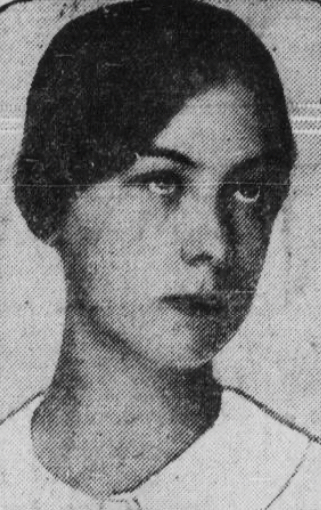
- Carr in a 1927 publication
- Born: 1911
- Died: 2001 (aged 89–90)
- Occupations: Cartoonist, illustrator
- Father: Gene Carr

Cléanthe Carr (1911 – 2001) was an American cartoonist and illustrator.

== Biography ==
Born 1911, Carr was the daughter of cartoonist Gene Carr. She worked as a cartoonist for The New Yorker. Also a physiognomist, she studied the face of murderer Eva Coo, with Carr noting her "wide, short neck" in an August 19 article. In 1935, she did illustrations for Huey Long's My First Days in the White House. She was also a Chow Chow breeder. In 1935, she hosted a mock wedding between two of her Chow Chows—Kubla Khan, aged 2 ½ and Li Hsein, aged 3. She bred them in 1936.

Carr died in 2001, aged 89 or 90. In 2023, a collection of her works were auctioned for the first time.
