= Nelson Norris Bickford =

Canadian American artist (1846 – 1943)

Nelson Norris Bickford (April 15, 1846 – December 5, 1943) was a Canadian American artist, known for his paintings and sculptures of animals. He was born in Québec, Canada, and later moved to Boston. He studied art at the Lowell Institute and became a highly successful portrait artist. He married and moved to France, where he studied at the Académie Julian with Gustave Boulanger, Jules Lefebvre, William-Adolphe Bouguereau and later Francesc Miralles i Galaup.

Returning to the United States, Bickford opened a studio in New York City, again attracting clientele and steady work before health issues and financial problems led him to find a permanent job, becoming an employee of the Metropolitan Museum of Art from 1906 to 1931. When he was not working, he sculpted, focusing mostly on animals. He is best known for creating The Thinker, a take on Auguste Rodin's Le Penseur, except that it depicts a monkey. It was shown at the National Academy of Design and entered a private collection. He continued to show his work at several galleries, including the Chicago Art Institute.

== Selected works ==
- Roaring Lion (1917)
- Le Penseur: With Apologies to Rodin (1915)
- Strutting Turkey (1915)
- Pelican (1904)
- The Hon. Edward Seymour
- Kitty's Birthday
- Missionary Encampment in Africa
- Death Struggle
- Leopard
- Cattle (1886)

== Exhibitions ==
- Shelburne Museum
- Carnegie Institute
- Art Institute of Chicago
- Pennsylvania Academy of the Fine Arts (1916)
- National Academy of Design (1915)
- Pennsylvania Academy of Fine Arts (1914, 1917)
- Armory Show (1913)
- National Academy of Design (1886)

== See also ==
- List of artists in the Armory Show
