= My First Days in the White House =

Book by Huey Long

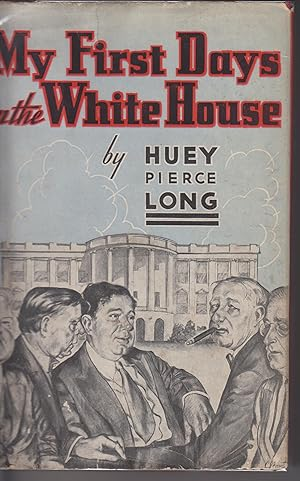
- Author: Huey Long
- Illustrator: Cléanthe Carr
- Language: English
- Genre: Autobiography
- Publication date: 1935
- Publication place: United States

My First Days in the White House is a 1935 book written by Huey Long, with full-page illustrations by New Yorker cartoonist Cléanthe Carr. Called Long's "second autobiography" and published posthumously in 1935, it emphatically laid out his presidential ambitions for the election of 1936.

== Summary ==
Approaching the 1936 presidential elections, Louisiana Senator Huey Long details a political fantasy in which he is president of the United States. Through imaginary conversations Long outlines his policies, including the "Share Our Wealth" plan, a balanced budget, an income cap of 500,000 dollars per year, and a program to eliminate dust storms. He also proposes to "reorganize and modernize" the American air forces, presumably as either a more autonomous component of the Army, or a separate branch altogether (later carried out in the National Security Act of 1947). Long fantasizes about his inauguration as President of the United States, detailing that he would be sworn in on the Bible his father had read to him and his brothers and sisters.

He also detailed his nomination picks for his cabinet, listed below. Long does not name a Secretary of Agriculture or Postmaster General, instead saying that those offices should be filled "from the recommendations of the farm organizations" and "according to their merit and record of service" respectively, with Long appointing two unnamed individuals. The book also suggests that the Director of the Budget should be elevated to a cabinet position, with Al Smith (D-New York) filling the role. The book does not name Long's vice president.

Position	Proposed secretary	Party	Home state
Secretary of State	William Edgar Borah	R	Idaho
Secretary of the Treasury	James J. Couzens	R	Michigan
Secretary of War	Smedley Butler	R	Pennsylvania
Secretary of the Navy	Franklin D. Roosevelt	D	New York
Secretary of the Interior	Lytle Brown	I	Tennessee
Secretary of Commerce	Herbert Hoover	R	California
Attorney General	Frank Murphy	D	Michigan
Secretary of Labor	Edward Keating	D	Colorado
Secretary of Agriculture	Not named	N/A	N/A
Postmaster General	Not named	N/A	"a western state"
