= Jack Callahan (cartoonist) =

American cartoonist

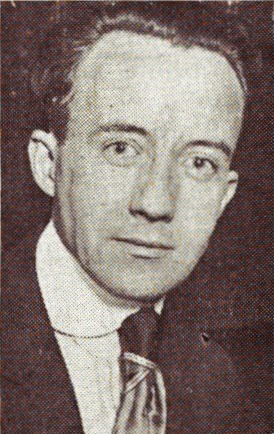
- Born: December 14, 1888; U.S.
- Died: August 24, 1954 (aged 65)
- Occupation: Cartoonist
- Spouse: Helen Carr (m. 1926)

John Thomas "Jack" Callahan (December 14, 1888 – August 24, 1954), was a noted cartoonist during the early decades of the 20th century, being also credited for drawing the diagram for the first American crossword.

== Biography ==
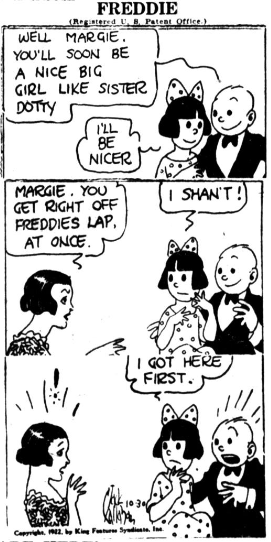
Jack Callahan's Freddie, the Sheik (October 30, 1922)

Apart from growing up in Brooklyn, New York, little else is known about his early life. In the early 1910s he began working for the New York World, first at the art department before becoming the paper's "crossword artist". By the middle of the decade he was doing editorial cartoons and a handful of comic strips such as Flivvers and When You Were a Boy, both running between 1916 and 1917.

During 1917 he moved to the Hearst organization, where he worked until 1940. That year he started the comic strip Over Here, which described common situations from different points of view. By 1918, the initially sparse collection of characters was settled on the Piffles, which were a typical American family of the time. Among them were "Calamity Jane", who was permanently pessimistic; "Comedian", who had a penchant for bad jokes; "Willie" the trouble-making kid, and love-struck couple "Hon" and "Dearie", who became the feature's titular characters between 1919 and 1921, when it became The Piffle Family.

Callahan's other strip beginning around 1922 was Freddie, the Sheik, centering on a young college graduate and his attempts to court women and make money. This quickly became Callahan's most successful work: By 1923–24, the strip merged with The Piffle Family and gained a Sunday page, being also featured in some Wrigley's chewing gum ads with other popular King Features characters. In spite of Freddie's popularity, in 1928-29 Callahan replaced it with Clarabelle's Cousin in order to cash in with the "pretty girl" melodrama strip boom. By late 1930 however it became a crime-adventure strip for a few months until ending in early 1931. Both strips' Sunday editions ran a topper called Dizzy's Eating House, about a low-rate diner and its scheming owner.

Chic Young briefly worked for Callahan as an assistant around 1923 after being hired by KFS. Callahan's style proved influential on Young, who further developed it with his own strips Dumb Dora and Blondie.

After a stint as an editorial cartoonist, Callahan revived the Piffle family format with Home, Sweet Home, which ran between 1935 and 1940. After a period as a freelance artist, he found employment in the comic book industry for Dell Publishing (where he worked on Tillie the Toiler stories) and DC Comics.

Callahan died in 1954 of a heart attack while playing tennis. He was survived by his wife Helen Carr (m. 1926) a former showgirl who performed diving stunts.
