= Gus Mager =

American painter and comics artist

Gus Mager Self Portrait (c. 1935)

Charles Augustus Mager (1878–1956), better known as Gus Mager, was an American painter, illustrator and cartoonist during the first half of the 20th century. He was the creator of several comic strips, notably Hawkshaw the Detective and Sherlocko the Monk.

== Early life ==
Mager was the son of German immigrants, and comics sent to his parents by their European relatives prompted his interest in cartooning. He began drawing sports cartoons which he sold to newspapers. By the age of 20, he already had a following when he expanded his repertoire to include clownish animals, and his cartoons soon appeared daily as In Jungle Land, or occasionally, In Jungle Society.

== Monk series ==
In 1904, he created the first of his successful Monk comic strips featuring monkey-like characters. Knocko the Monk was soon followed by new figures such as Rhymo the Monk, Mufti the Monk, Freshy the Monk, Henpecko the Monk, Groucho the Monk and the most popular, Sherlocko the Monk.

== Hawkshaw the Detective ==
In 1913, Mager humanized Sherlocko into his Hawkshaw the Detective strip, which appeared in The New York World. During the 1920s, Mager worked as an assistant on Rudolph Dirks' Captain and the Kids. Other comics by Mager included And Then Papa Came (1904), Main Street, Oliver's Adventures (1926), Obliging Otto (1913) and Millionbucks (1913). Mager continued Sherlocko and Hawkshaw until his retirement in the late 1940s.

== Paintings ==
Mager's paintings are in many collections, including the Whitney Museum and the Newark Museum of Art. He was widely exhibited during his lifetime, showing at the Whitney, the Corcoran Gallery of Art and the Pennsylvania Academy of Fine Arts. He was a member of the Salon of Independent Artists and the Salons of America. In 1913, he was included in the famous Armory Show. Mager said: "I try to paint with my heart and with my senses without worrying about style."

Mager, his wife Matilda and his son Robert lived for years in Newark, New Jersey, with a summer home in SandBrook, New Jersey, where he loved to hunt with his hound dog, Sport. Eventually, they moved from Newark to Millburn, New Jersey. SandBrook storeowner Clint Wilson recalled:

Gus Mager loved the countryside and he bought a farm in SandBrook for a summer home. The farm was the site of an old mill many years before, and the house was constructed of stone and obviously was of early structure ... When he took us into the basement of his beautiful home, it was almost a museum, with piles of paintings on the wall and on tables. Actually, his work was his enjoyment. He told me that each morning, he would take a long walk through the fields and woods, that he would get some idea of nature for a painting, and he would come back and spend the day perfecting that idea. You can't conceive what a pile of paintings he had turned out, all of them beautiful, painted for enjoyment.

After his wife's death, Mager went to live with his son in Pennsylvania. At age 77, he died of cancer in 1956.

== See also ==
- List of artists in the Armory Show
