= Robert Moore Brinkerhoff =

American cartoonist (1880–1958)

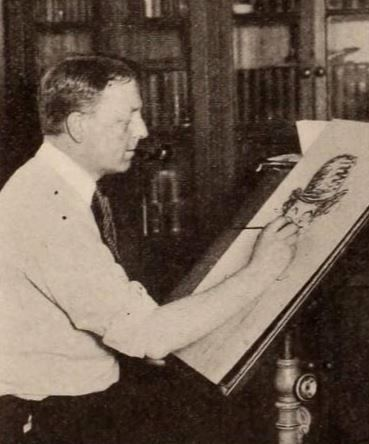
- Brinkerhoff drawing a Charlie Chaplin cartoon for First National in the Exhibitors Herald. Vol. 6, no. 20. 11 May 1918. p. 40 – via Internet Archive (NYPL).
- Born: Robert Moore Brinkerhoff; May 4, 1880; Toledo, Ohio
- Died: February 17, 1958 (aged 77); Minneapolis

Robert "Bob" Moore Brinkerhoff (4 May 1880 Toledo, Ohio – 17 February 1958 Minneapolis), often credited as R. M. Brinkerhoff (also familiarly known as "Brink"), was an American newspaper cartoonist and illustrator active in the early twentieth century. In 1917 he joined the staff of the New York Evening Mail, where he worked as a political and editorial cartoonist.

== Life and career ==
Robert Moore Brinkerhoff's father, Robert Alexander Brinkerhoff (1844–1917), with Henry Sheldon Chapin (1835–1915), founded the Toledo Post, which merged with the Toledo News-Bee. R.A. Brinkerhoff, later (around 1900), had served as Advertising Agent with The Toledo Express.

R. M. Brinkerhoff, after graduating from high school, worked for the Toledo News-Bee. He later moved to New York, where, from 1900 to 1901, he studied at the Art Students League. In 1905 he studied in Paris at the Académie de la Grande Chaumière before returning to Ohio to draw political cartoons for the Toledo Blade. He subsequently worked for the Cleveland Leader and the Cincinnati Post. In 1913 he returned to New York and worked as a political cartoonist for the New York Evening Mail for about three years.

He was perhaps best known as the creator of the long-running comic strip Little Mary Mixup, which debuted January 2, 1918, and continued for several decades – distributed by United Feature Syndicate. Brinkerhoff also drew a Sunday topper strip, All in the Family, which ran from April 3, 1932, to July 21, 1940. He wrote instructional columns on cartooning for Tip Top magazine.

Brinkerhoff produced editorial cartoons during the First World War period, though his reputation rests primarily on his newspaper comic strip work rather than wartime illustrations.

=== Death ===
Brinkerhoff died February 17, 1958, in Minneapolis. He was survived by his second wife, Edna Patterson (maiden 1879–1961), and his son, Robert Huston Brinkerhoff (1907–1998) from his first marriage to Jean Carrington Huston (1881–1934). He outlived his older sister, Esther Stewart Brinkerhoff (1875–1923), an artist and art educator.

== Gallery ==
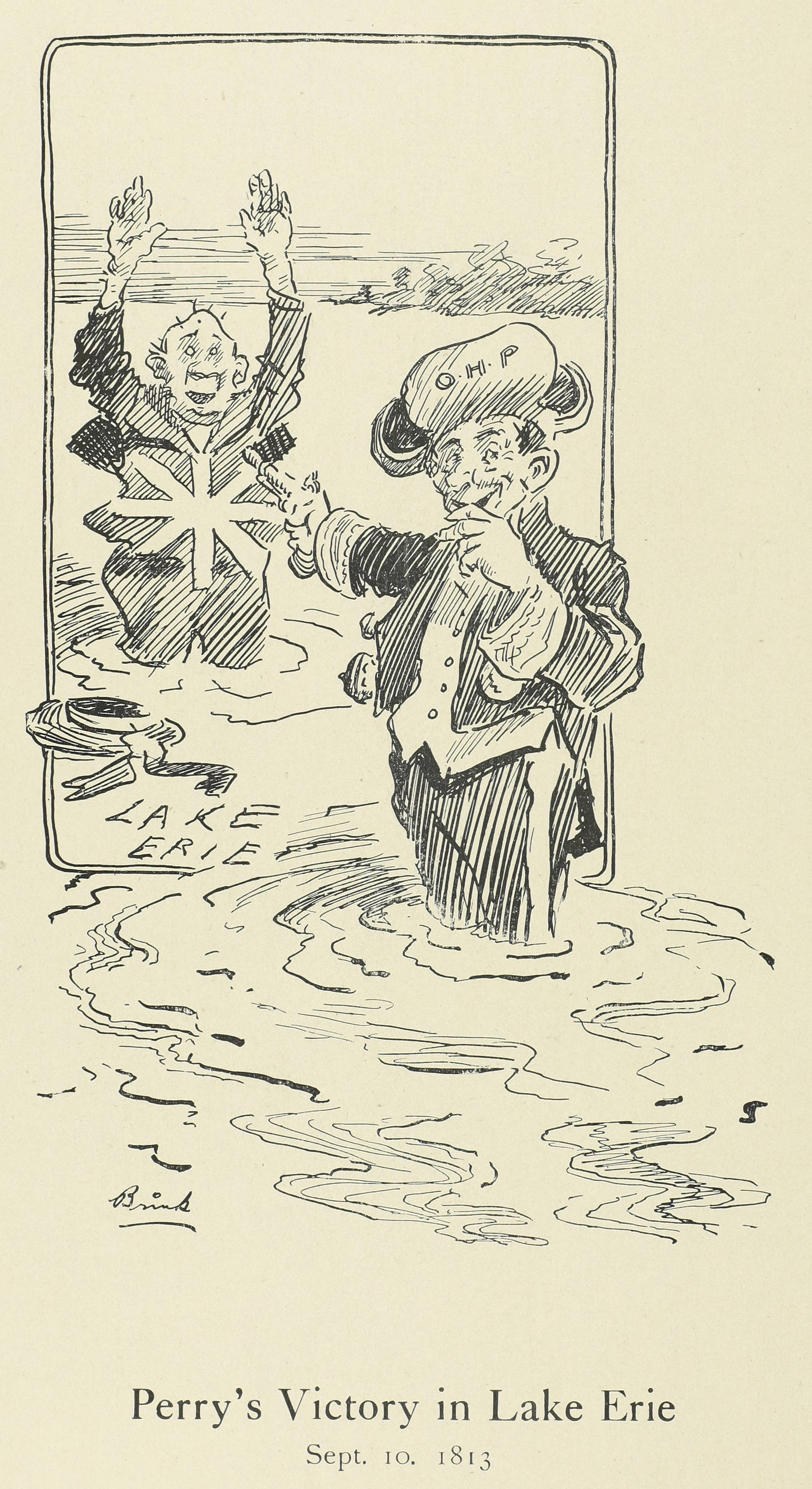
"Perry's Victory in Lake Erie," (1906) referencing the War of 1812 Battle of Lake Erie (Sept. 10, 1813), in which the U.S. Navy, under Commodore Oliver Hazard Perry, defeated the British Fleet.

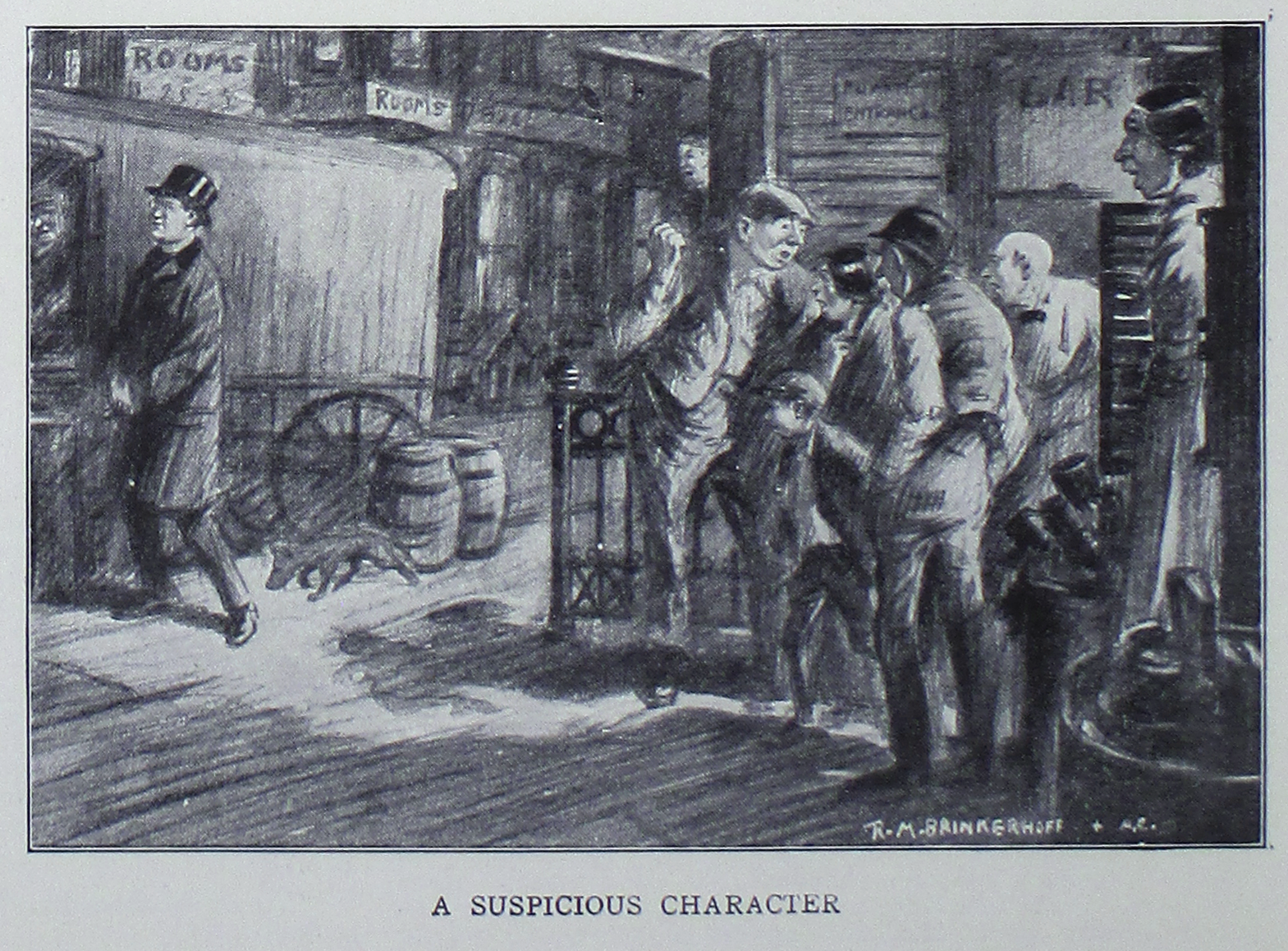
"A Suspicious Character," from Caricature – Wit and Humor of a Nation in Picture, Song and Story (13th ed.). 1918 – via Internet Archive.

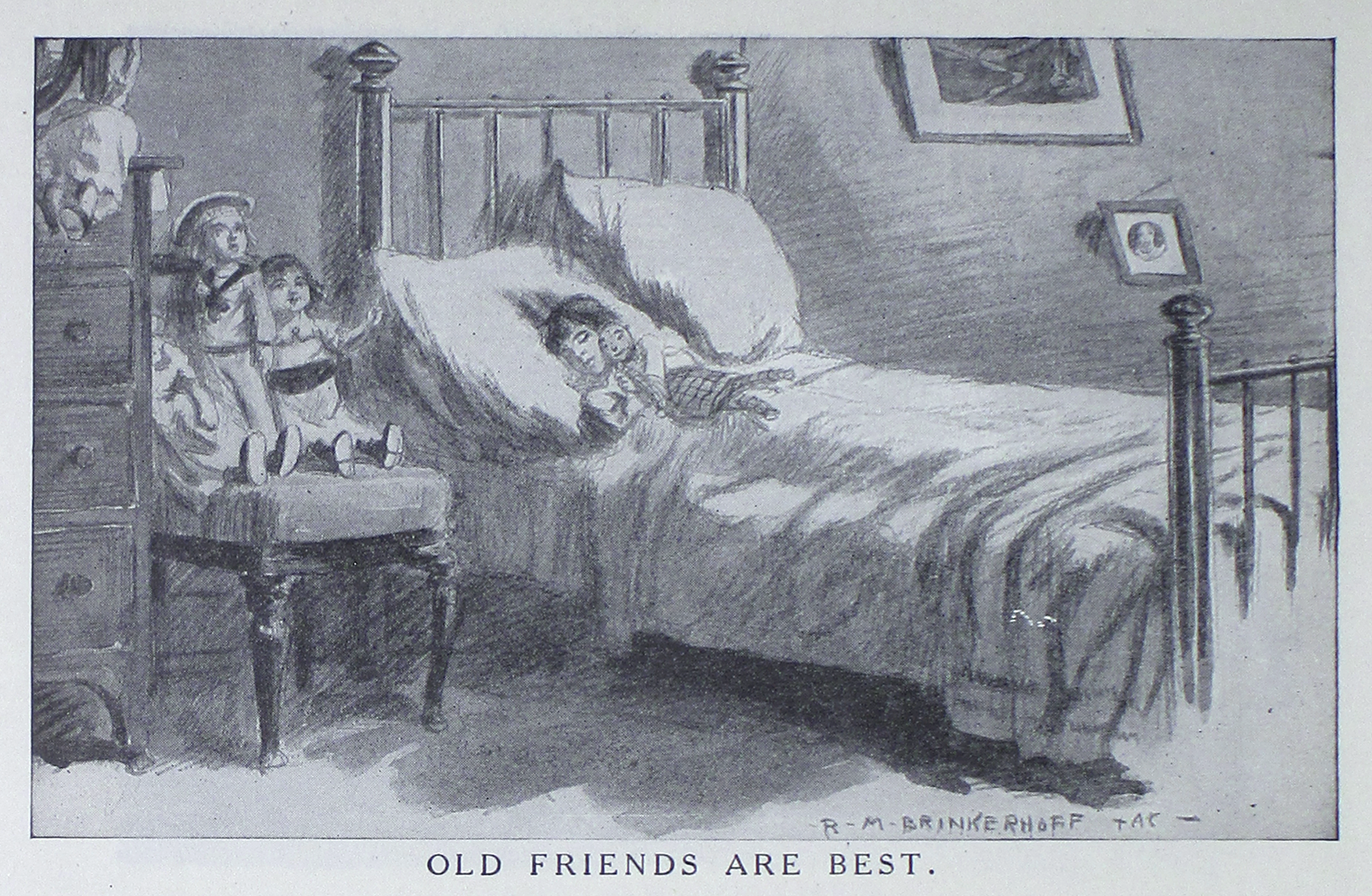
"Old Friends Are Best," from Caricature: Wit and Humor of a Nation in Picture, Song and Story (13th ed.). 1918 – via Internet Archive.

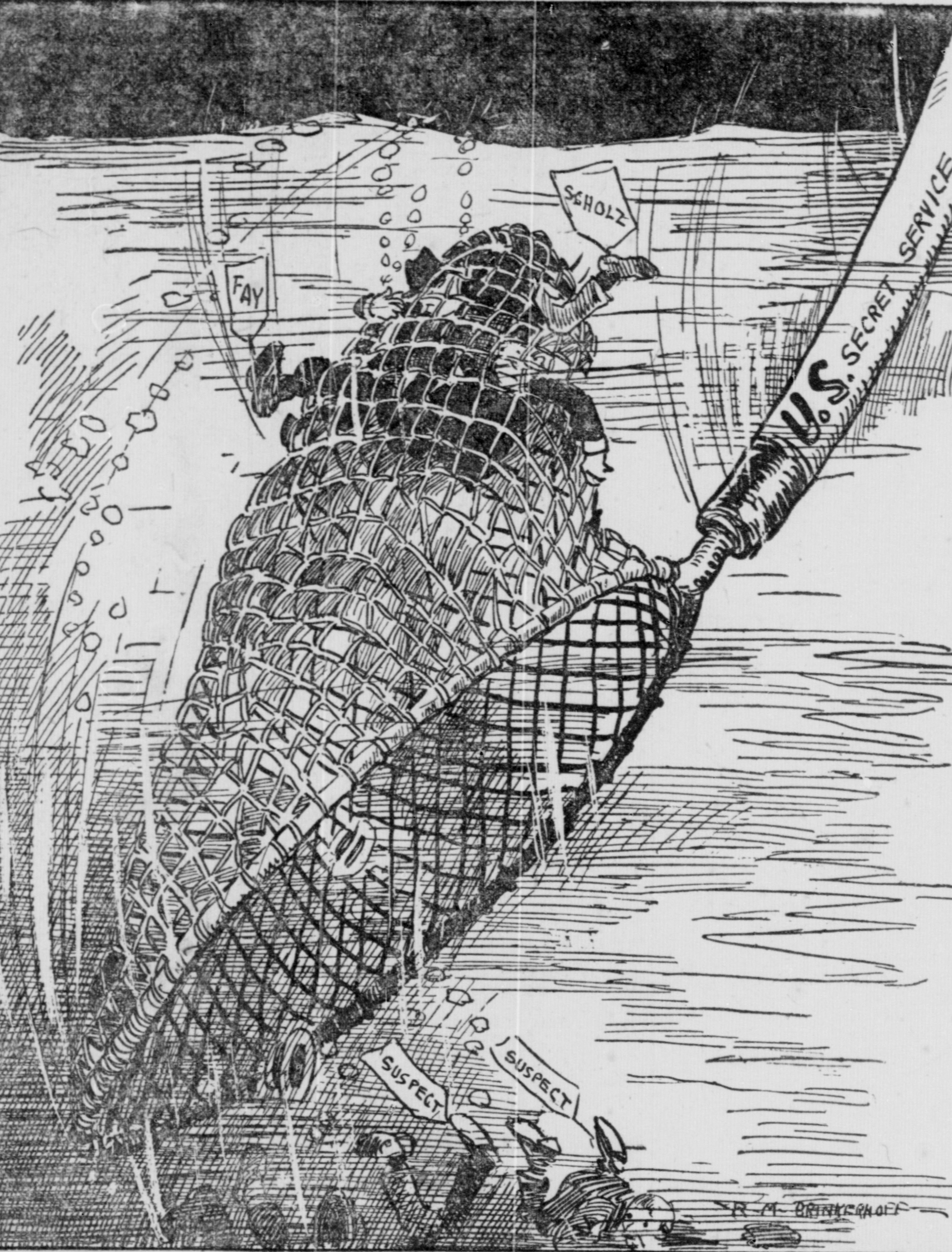
"Still Fishing" (US Secret Service rounding up German spies), in South Bend News-Times (front page, top right, © 1915 S.S. McClure). Vol. 32, no. 302. 29 October 1915 – via Newspapers.com.

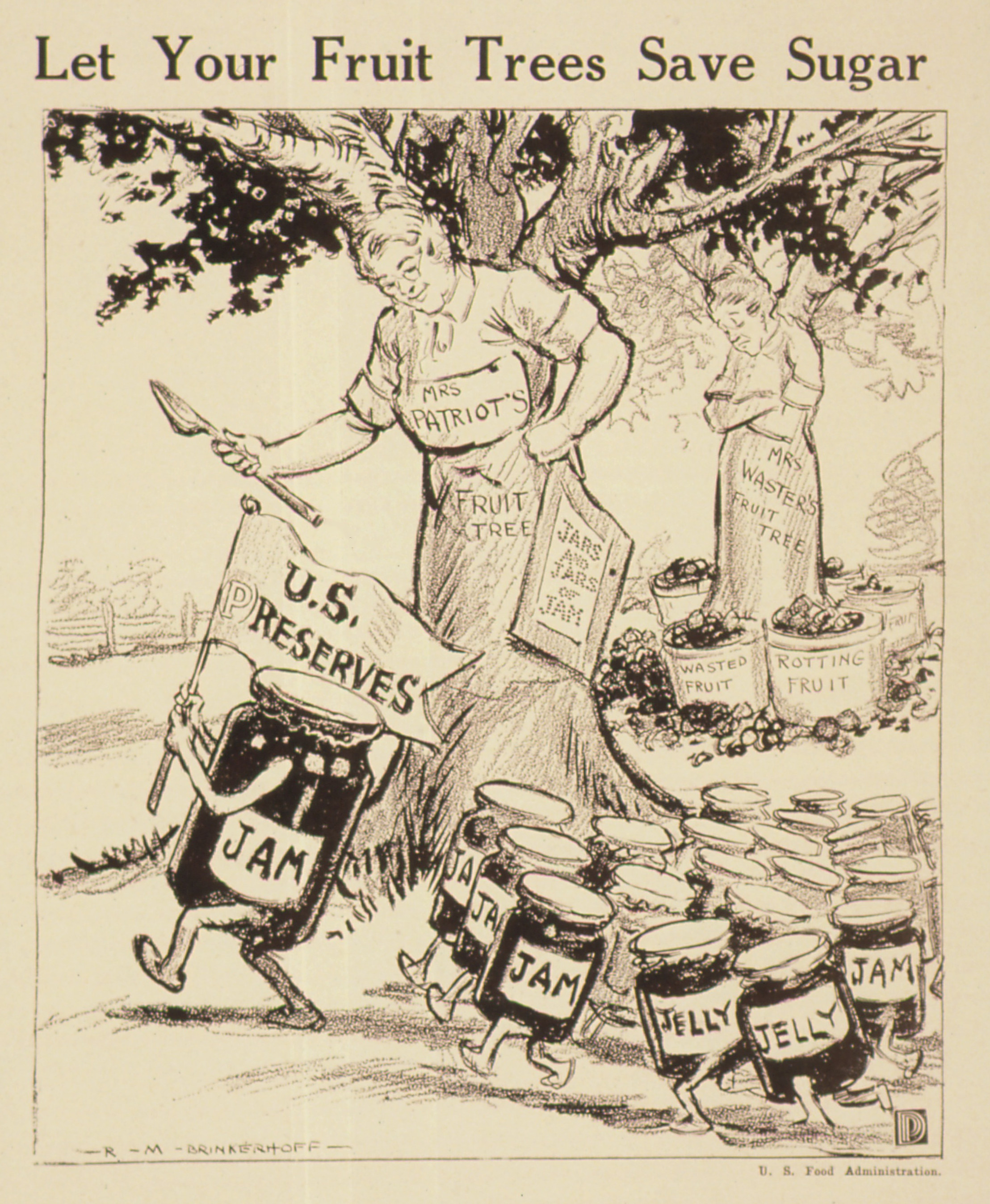
"Let Your Fruit Trees Save Sugar," U.S. Food Administration, Educational Division, Advertising Section (c. 1917–1919)

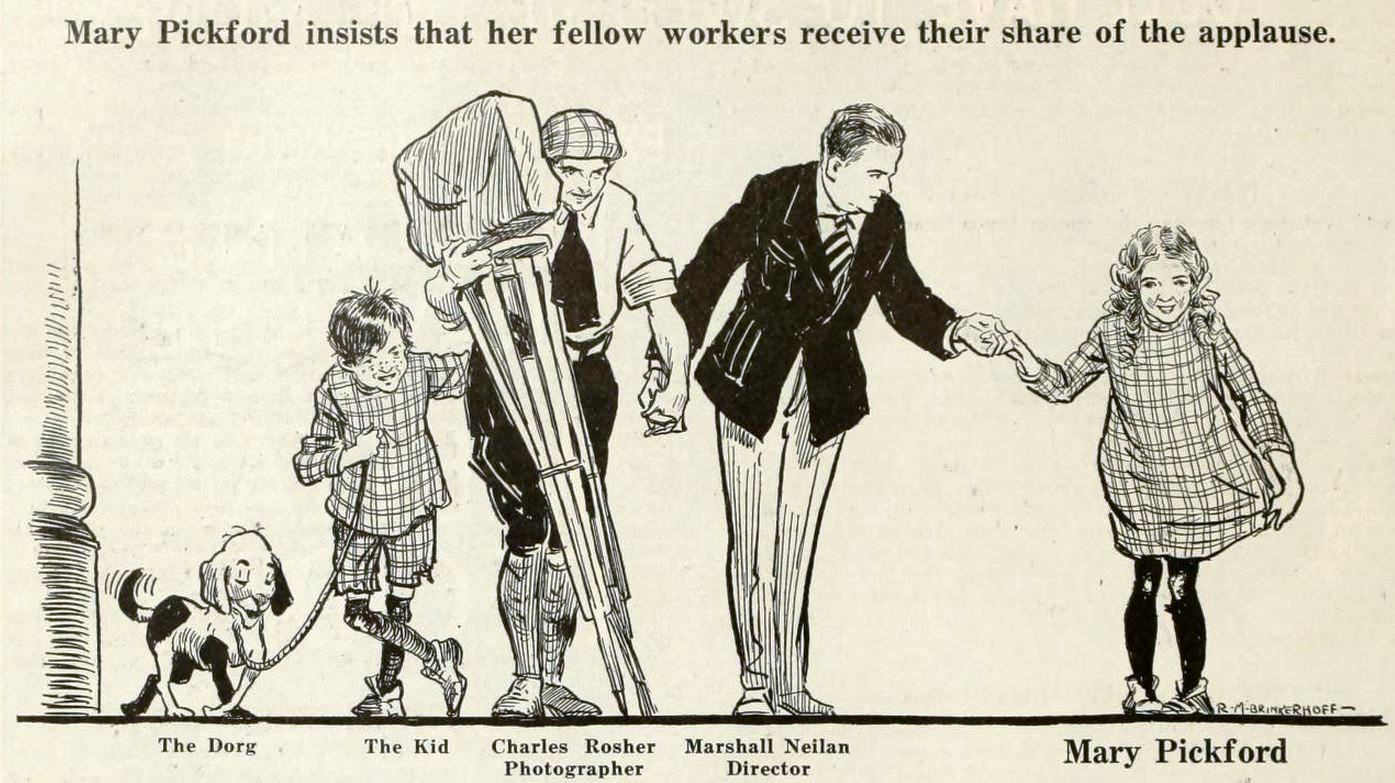
"Mary Pickford insist that her fellow workers receive their share of the applause." Cartoon ad for the American film Daddy-Long-Legs (1919) in Moving Picture World. Vol. 40, no. 9. 31 May 1919. p. 1294 – via Internet Archive.

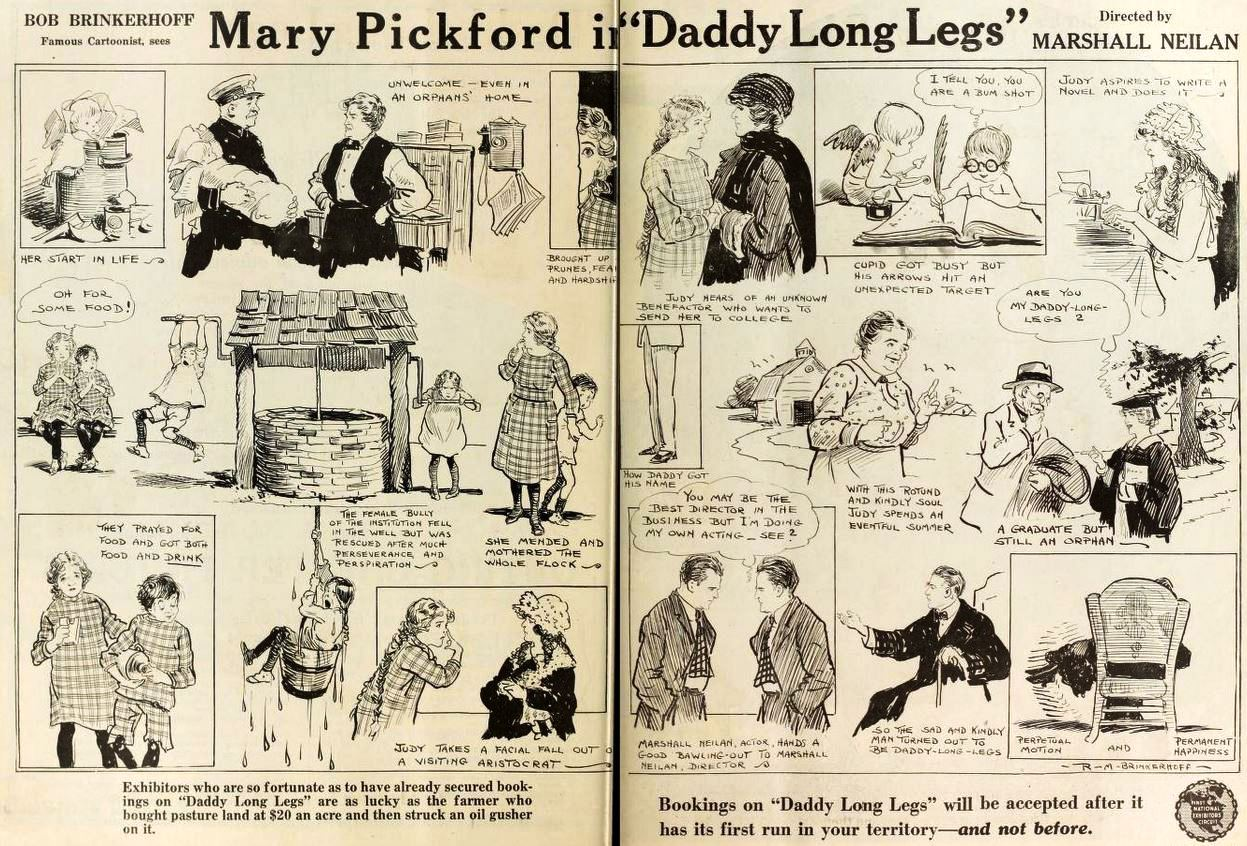
Comic-strip ad for Daddy-Long-Legs (1919) in Moving Picture World. Vol. 40, no. 7. 17 May 1919. pp. 984–195 – via Internet Archive.

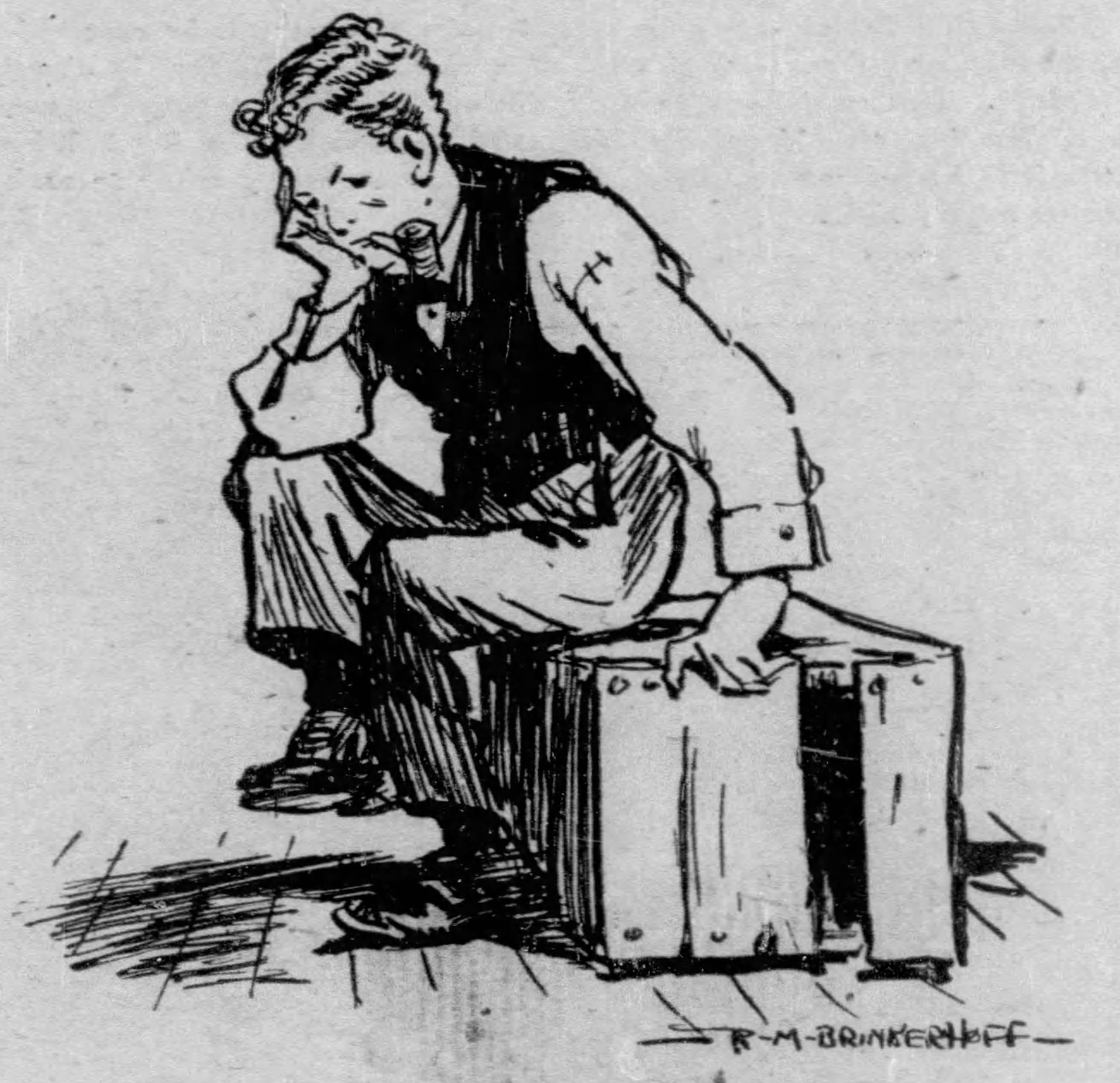
"Robert M. Brinkerhoff as he looks to himself," self caricature, in the Illustrated Daily News. Vol. 1, no. 6. New York. 2 July 1919. p. 13 ProQuest 2260421589.

== Publications illustrated by Brinkerhoff ==
Fiction
- Knibbs, Henry Herbert (1919). The Ridin' Kid from Powder River. New York: Grosset & Dunlap. LCCN 2023-656551; OCLC 9352915 (all editions).

See article about the 1924 film, The Ridin' Kid From Powder River.

1. Via Internet Archive (University of Minnesota).
- Dillon, Mary (March 1919). The American. New York: The Century Company. LCCN 19-4847; OCLC 7014283 (all editions).
1. Via HathiTrust (Harvard).
Educational textbooks
- Schweikert, Harry Christian; Inglis, Rewey Belle; Gehlmann, John Alexander (eds.). Adventures in American Literature. Illustrated by R. M. Brinkerhoff. New York & Chicago: Harcourt, Brace and Company. LCCN 30-10826; OCLC 2653221 (all editions).
1. 1930 ed.
2. 1934 ed.
- Kirby, Thomas Joseph; Carpenter, Millington Farwell; Knott, Thomas Albert (eds.). Pupil Activity – English Series. Illustrated by R. M. Brinkerhoff. New York & Chicago: Harcourt, Brace and Company. OCLC 18281463 (all editions).
1. Book 7. 1930 – via Google Books (Illinois).

== Bibliography ==
=== References ===
- Brinkerhoff, Robert Moore (cartoonist of the Toledo Blade) (1906). Men of Toledo (And Their Neighbors). "Printed in Cartoon With a Historical Preface From 'Official' Data". Preparatory by Robinson Locke. Toledo: The Express Publishing and Printing Company. OCLC 2198302 (all editions).
1. Via Internet Archive (Toledo Lucas County Public Library).
- Clark, Edna Maria. Ohio Art and Artists. Richmond, Virginia: Garrett and Massie. p. 445. LCCN 32-25121; OCLC 349627 (all editions).
1. Via Internet Archive (Kahle/Austin Foundation; Allen County Public Library, discarded).
- Cincinnati Post (The) (11 January 1911). "There's a New Hand in the Cartoon Factory". Vol. 61, no. 4. p. 1. OCLC sn84028694; OCLC 11416278 (all editions).
1. Via Newspapers.com.
Re: Harold Tucker Webster (1885–1952)
- Dartmouth Alumni Magazine. LCCN ca14-455; ISSN 2150-671X; OCLC 4719181 (all editions).
1. "Obituaries": "1929" – "Robert Huston Brinkerhoff" (obituary). Vol. 91, no. 9. June 1999. p. 95.
- Duke, Sara W. (2017) [1st ed.: 2012]. Rhode, Michael (ed.). Biographical Sketches of Cartoonists & Illustrators in the Swann Collection of the Library of Congress. Sara Duke is Curator of Popular and Applied Graphic Art, Prints & Photographs Division of the Library of Congress. Arlington, Virginia: ComicsDC through Lulu.com. ISBN 978-1-3048-5888-7, 1-3048-5888-X; OCLC 881092517 (all editions).
1. "Robert Moore Brinkerhoff". pp. 39–40.
  1. Via Internet Archive.
  2. Via Google Books (limited preview).
In Wikimedia, see: Category:Swann Collection of Caricature and Cartoon.
- Haverstock, Mary Sayre; Vance, Jeannette Mahoney; Meggitt, Brian L., eds. (2000). Artists in Ohio, 1787–1900 : A Biographical Dictionary. Jeffrey Weidman, Project Director. Oberlin, Ohio: Oberlin College Libraries. Kent, Ohio & London: Kent State University Press. LCCN 98-3433; doi:10.1604/9780873386166; ISBN 978-0-8733-8616-6, 0-8733-8616-7 (hardback), ISBN 978-1-6127-7194-6, 1-6127-7194-7 (eBook), ISBN 978-1-6127-7195-3, 1-6127-7195-5 (online); OCLC 1011745049 (all editions).
1. "Brinkerhoff, Robert Moore". p. 117 – via Google Books (limited preview).
2. "Brinkerhoff, Esther S.". p. 117 – via Google Books (limited preview).
- Hawkins, Arnette M. (2009). "On the Brink of Humor: An Examination of the History of Political Cartoons, Journalism and the Contributions of Robert Moore Brinkerhoff" (PhD in History, dissertation, University of Toledo). Charles Nelson Glaab, PhD (1927–2009), advisor. ISBN 978-1-1092-4038-2; ProQuest 305004280 (subscription required) (preview only, pp. 1–14; Dissertations & Theses Abstracts & Indexes database); OCLC 851374895 (all editions).
- Holtz, Allan (2012). American Newspaper Comics: An Encyclopedic Reference Guide. Ann Arbor: The University of Michigan Press. p. 240. LCCN 2010-33752; ISBN 978-0-4721-1756-7, 0-4721-1756-4; OCLC 617508967 (all editions).
1. Via Internet Archive (St. Louis Community College; withdrawn) (very limited preview).
- Horn, Maurice, ed. (1976). The World Encyclopedia of Comics (2 Vols.). New York: Chelsea House Publishers. LCCN 76-7322; ISBN 978-0-8775-4042-7, 0-8775-4042-X (Vol. 1), ISBN 978-0-8775-4030-4, 0-8775-4030-6 (Vol. 2); OCLC 2136986 (all editions).
1. Horn, Maurice. Vol. 1: "Brinkerhoff, Robert Moore". pp. 132–133.
  1. Via Internet Archive.
- Library of Congress (1884–1886). Toledo Post. Toledo, Ohio: Chapin, Brinkerhoff & Co. LCCN sn90-68039; OCLC 20975327 (all editions).
- Library of Congress (1903–1938). Toledo News-Bee. Toledo, Ohio: Toledo Newspaper Co. LCCN sn90-68039; OCLC 20975327 (all editions).
- Minneapolis Morning Tribune (18 February 1958). "Brinkerhoff, 78, Comic Artist, Dies". Vol. 91, no. 270. p. 19 (column 2, lower half). LCCN sn83-16773; OCLC 10110511 (all editions).
1. Via Newspapers.com.
2. Via ProQuest 1860586444 (database: Historical Newspapers: U.S. Collection).
- New York Times (The). LCCN sn00-61556; ISSN 0362-4331, ISSN 1553-8095 (online).
1. "R.M. Brinkerhoff, 76, Long a Cartoonist" (obituary). Dateline: "Minneapolis, Feb. 17 [1958] (UP)". Vol. 107, no. 36550. 18 February 1958. p. 28 (column 2, top). Retrieved February 16, 2026.
  1. Via TimesMachine.
  2. Pdf via TimesMachine (PDF).
  3. Permalink via TimesMachine.
  4. Via ProQuest 114636193 (Historical Newspapers database).
2. "Mrs. R.M. Brinkerhoff" (obituary). Vol. 111, no. 37941. 10 December 1961. p. 88 (column 5, bottom half). Retrieved February 16, 2026.
  1. Via TimesMachine blog.
  2. Via TimesMachine.
  3. Pdf via TimesMachine (PDF).
  4. Permalink via TimesMachine.
  5. Via ProQuest 115278891 (Historical Newspapers database).

=== Tertiary references ===
- Who's Who in America. Chicago: Marquis Who's Who. LCCN 04-16934; ISSN 0083-9396; OCLC 1141571.
1. Vol. 31: "Brinkerhoff, Robert Huston". 1960–1961. p. 356.
  1. Via Internet Archive.
