= Denys Wortman =

American painter and comics artist

- Born: May 2, 1887
- Died: September 20, 1958 (aged 71)
- Areas: Painter, Cartoonist
- Notable works: Metropolitan Movies

Denys Wortman (May 2, 1887 – September 20, 1958) was a painter, cartoonist and comic strip creator. From 1924 to 1954 he drew the comic strip Metropolitan Movies (originated by Gene Carr in 1921), which ran in the New York World and was syndicated nationwide by the World Feature Service and later United Feature Syndicate.

His work was the subject of an exhibition at the Museum of the City of New York in 2011.
