= Friedrich August Weinzheimer =

German painter

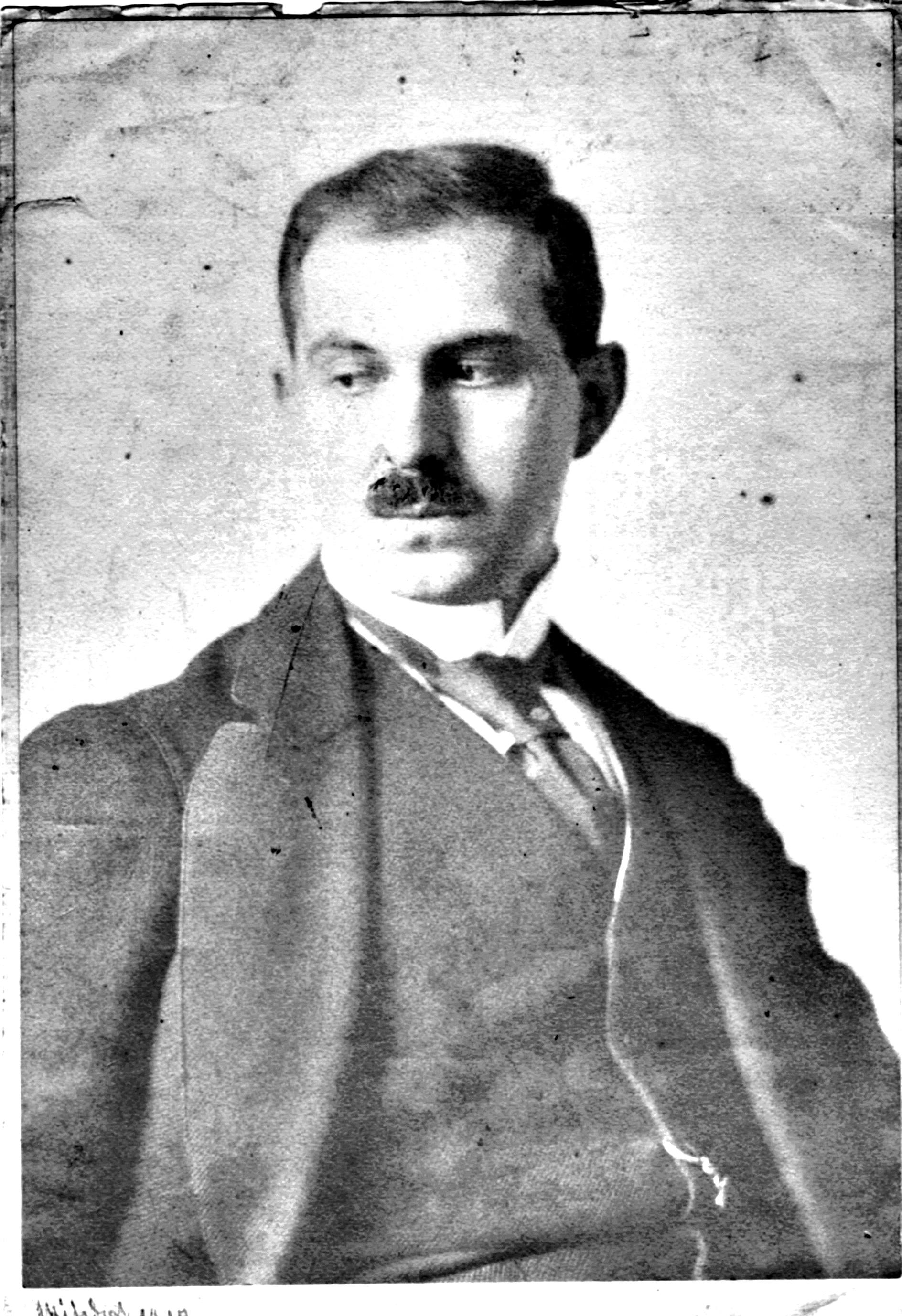
Weinzheimers 1912

Friedrich August Weinzheimer (29 September 1882 in Golzheim – 1947 in Florence) was a German painter, draftsman and graphic artist.

== Life ==
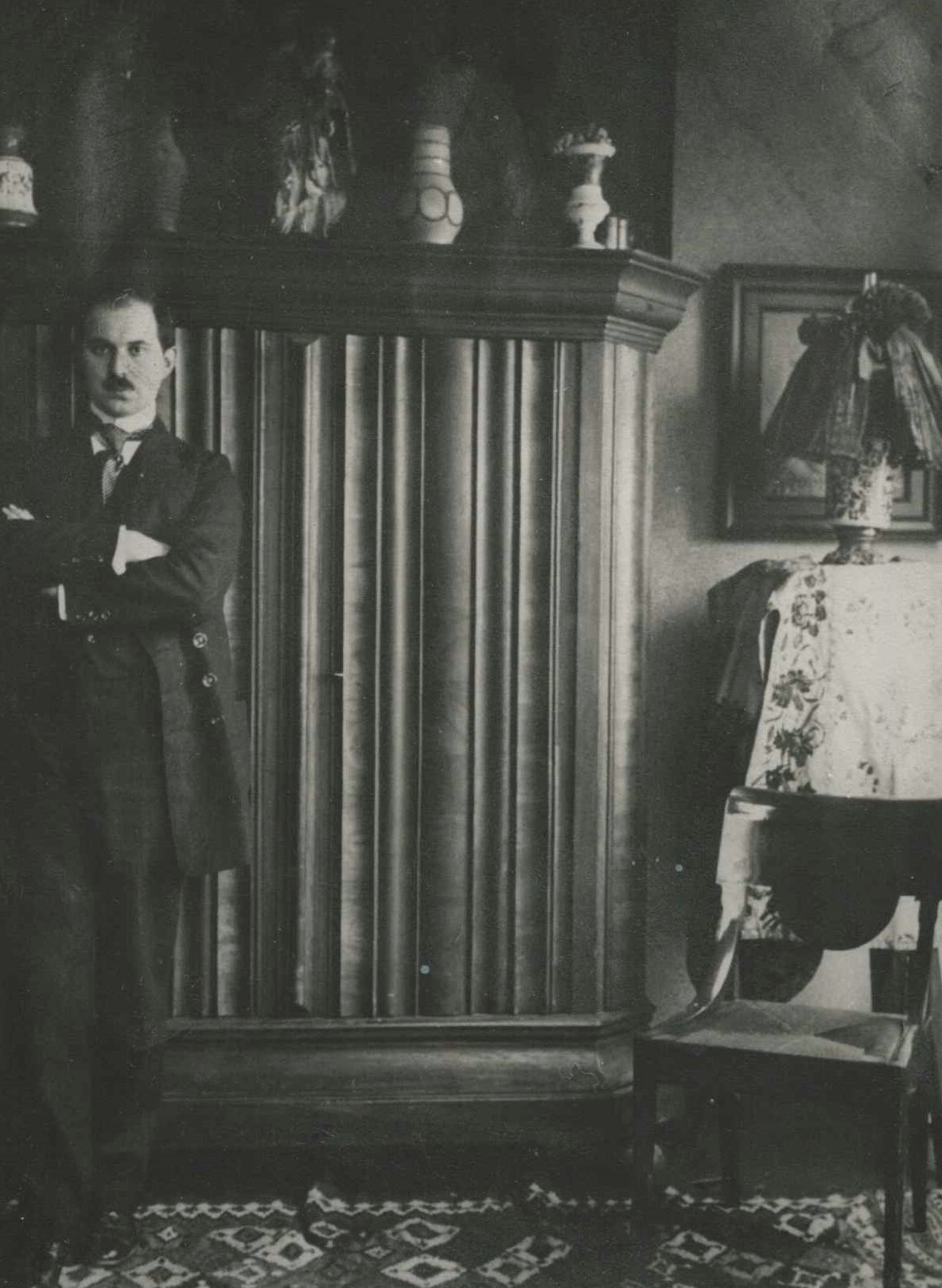
Weinzheimer Florence, 1914

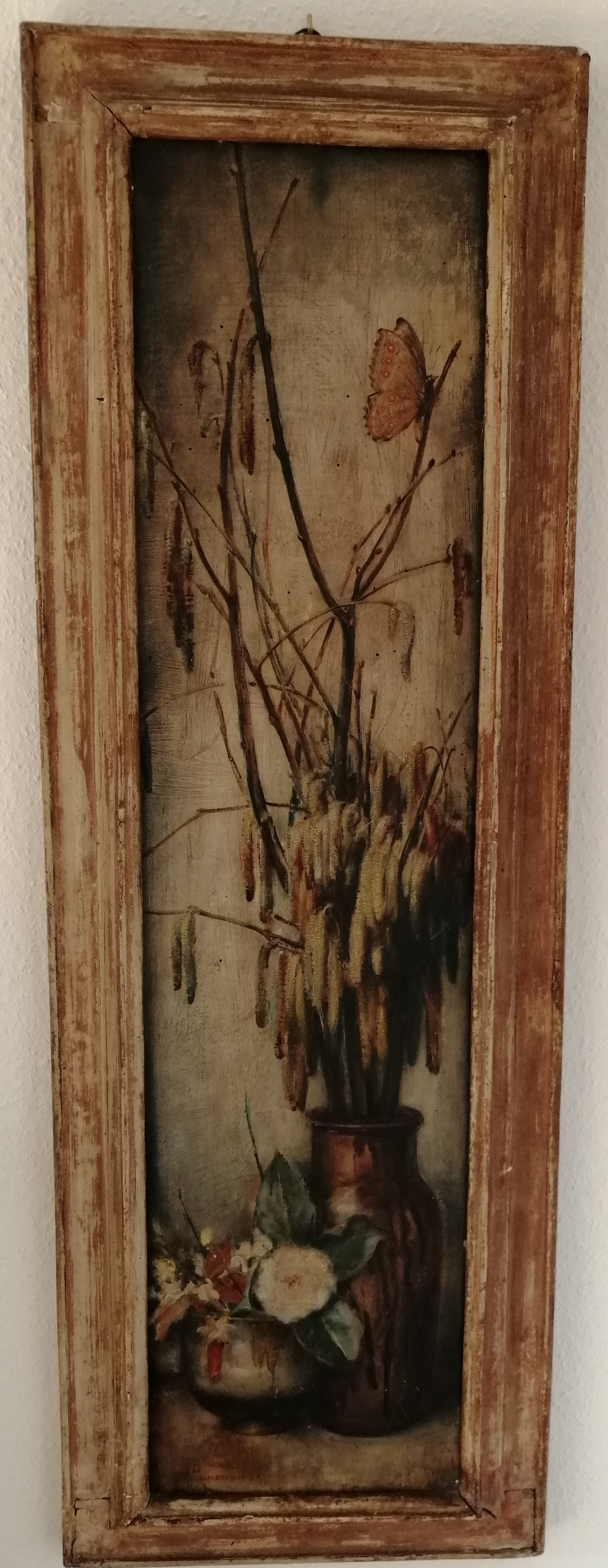
Still life

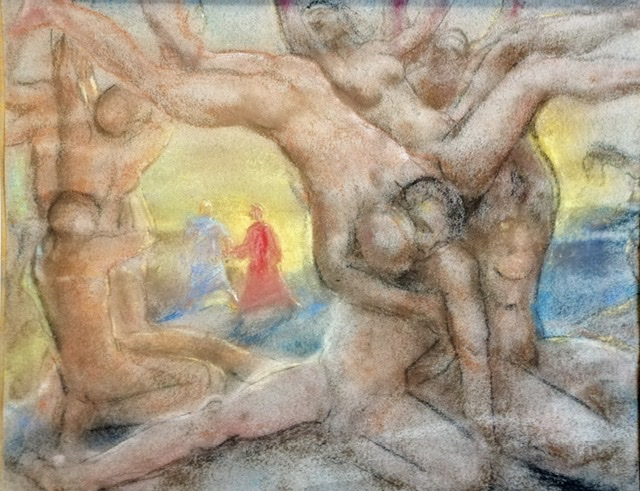
Dantes Inferno

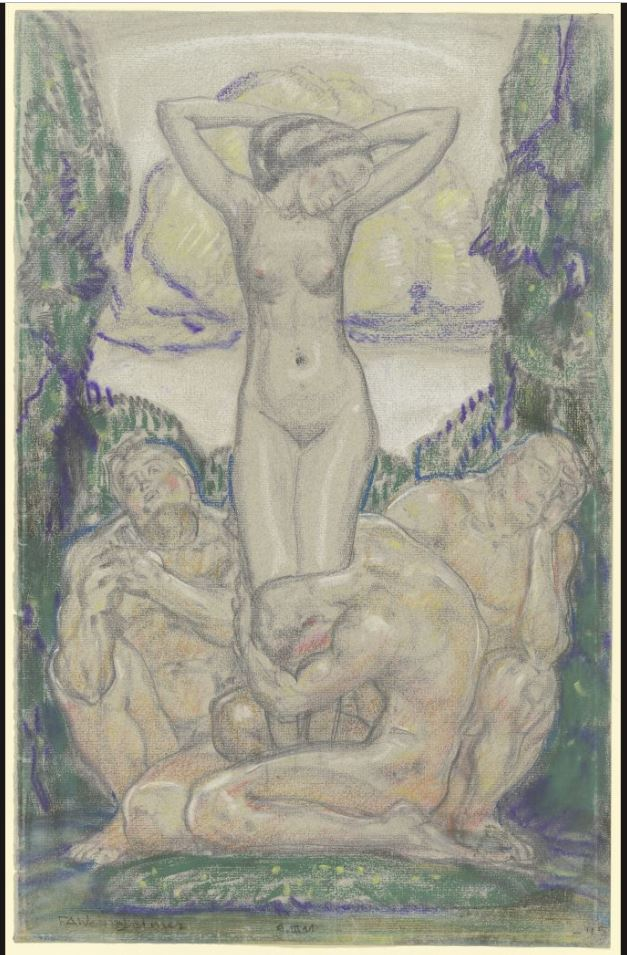
Worship II vom 9. March 1911 Frankfurter Städel Museum

He studied from 1900 to 1902 at the Düsseldorf Academy, from 1903 to 1907 at the Academy in Berlin. From 1908 to 1917 he was active in Cologne, where his works were mostly sold by the Cologne art dealer Abels, and from 1913 to 1914 in the United States. From 1918 to 1922 he lived again in Cologne, then in Florence.

In 1905 he received the Menzel Prize, 1914 a quarter of a year's residence as part of the Villa Romana Prize which he could no longer compete because of the outbreak of the First World War. At the art historical meaningful ArmoryShow 1913 Weinzheimer was represented next to Picasso, Van Gogh, Monet and other representatives of the modern with two works. Weinzheimer 1909 co-founder of the Cologne Artists' Association, whose chairman he was until 1911. Later he was active in the secession, the Cologne Secession. His signature was F.A. Weinzheimer. Weinzheimer's main work is the cycle "Dante's Inferno". In 1937 six of his works in Germany were demonstrably confiscated from public collections as part of the Nazi campaign “Degenerate Art”. However, he was allowed to continue exhibiting. In 2013, two of his works were exhibited by the New York Historical Society.

Works confiscated from public collections in Germany as “degenerate” in 1937

- Love / couple (etching, 17.2 × 23 cm, 1914; sheet 11 of the confiscated 1st portfolio of the Düsseldorf Society for Contemporary Art; art collections of the city of Düsseldorf. 1940 for “exploitation” on the art market to the art dealer Bernhard A. Böhmer. whereabouts unknown)
- Carrying the Cross (Etching; Art Collections of the City of Düsseldorf)
- Two naked people (Etching; Art Collections of the City of Düsseldorf. Destroyed)
- Mass grave (etching; art collections of the city of Düsseldorf. Destroyed)
- The Bolshevik (Watercolour; Municipal Art Collection Duisburg. Destroyed)
- Dancing Couple (Prints; City Picture Gallery Wuppertal-Elberfeld. Destroyed)

Other works

- Iron Foundry (oil, c. 1940)
- Villa d'Este near Rome (oil, c. 1940)

== Exhibitions ==
1911, November - December: 23rd Exhibition of the Berlin Secession, Drawing Arts, Berlin, Ausstellungshaus am Kürfürstendamm 208/9

1912, May - September: International Art Exhibition of the Specialist Association of West German Art Friends and Artists at Cologne, Cologne, Städtische Ausstellungshalle am Aachener Tor

1912, November to December: 25th Exhibition of the Berlin Secession, Drawing Arts, Berlin, Ausstellungshaus am Kürfürstendamm 208/9

1913: Cölner Secession, Cologne, Wallraf-Richartz-Museum

1912: Kunsthütte Chemnitz

1913, April: Städtische Kunsthalle Düsseldorf

1913, February - March: International Exhibition of Modern Art (Armory Show), New York, Armory of the 69th Infantry

1913, March - April: International Exhibition of Modern Art (Armory Show), Chicago The Art Institute of Chicago

1913, April - May: International Exhibition of Modern Art (Armory Show), Boston, Copley Hall

1913, October - November: Opening exhibition, Kölnischer Kunstverein, Cologne, Gemäldegalerie des Kölnischen Kunstvereins

1914, February - March: International exhibition in the Kunsthalle Bremen, Bremen,

1914, May, Collections: Schmidt-Rottluff / Alexander Kanoldt / F.A. Weinzheimer / L.L. Wulf. Sculptures, Berlin, Fritz Gurlitt

1921, March - October: Exhibition German Art in the Kunsthalle Baden-Baden

1914, July: "New Art" Hans Goltz, Munich

1940: Great German Art Exhibition, Munich, House of German Art

== Literature ==
- (in German) Magdalena Maria Moeller: Der Sonderbund: Seine Voraussetzungen und Anfänge in Düsseldorf, Rheinland-Verlag, Köln/Bonn 1984, ISBN 978-3-79270-798-2. S. 198.
- (in German) Weinzheimer, Friedrich August. In: Ulrich Thieme, Felix Becker (editors): Allgemeines Lexikon der Bildenden Künstler von der Antike bis zur Gegenwart. Band 35: Waage–Wilhelmson. E. A. Seemann, Leipzig 1942, S. 306.

== Sources ==
1. ↑Worship II, collection Staedelmuseum; retrieved on October 23, 2019
2. ↑ Villa Romana: award winner; retrieved on October 23, 2019
3. ↑ Magdalena M. Moeller: The Sonderbund: His premises and beginnings in Düsseldorf, Rheinland-Verlag, 1984, p. 198
4. ↑ New York Historical Society: The New Art Spirit: The Armory Show at 100, overview of the paintings for the exhibition 2013; retrieved on October 23, 2019
5. ↑ Exhibition German Art in Baden-Baden from 19 March to 31 October 1921; retrieved on October 23, 2019
6. ↑ Exhibitions in the Gallery Hans Goltz; retrieved on October 23,
