= Derwent Lees =

Australian painter

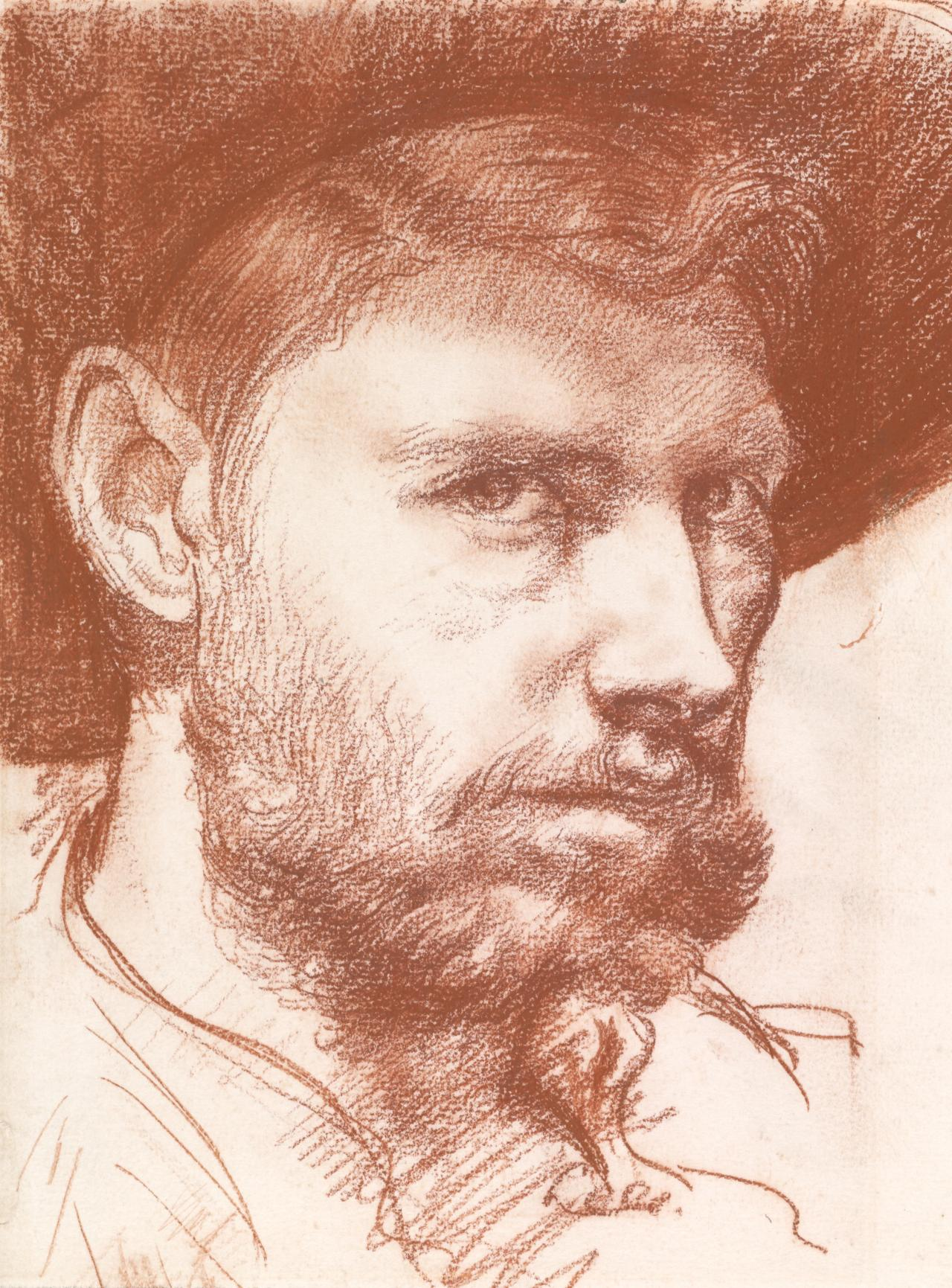
Self-portrait, Derwent Lees, c.1908, red chalk on paper, 26.1 x 22.2 cm, National Gallery of Victoria, Melbourne Australia

Derwent Lees (14 November 1884 – 28 March 1931) was an Australian draughtsman, landscape and figure painter.

== Biography ==
Derwent Lees was born in Hobart, Australia, in November 1884, the youngest of ten children. His father was general manager of the Union Bank of Australia. He studied at Melbourne Grammar School in 1899–1900, and later lost a foot in a riding accident, subsequently wearing a wooden prosthetic foot. He moved to London in 1905 and, following a brief stay in Paris, commenced his studies at the Slade School of Fine Art under the supervision of Henry Tonks and Frederick Brown. While still a student, he was invited to join the Slade staff in late 1907, a position he held for ten years.

His earliest known works are pencil drawings created in c.1907 while at the Slade School. These remain held by the Art Museum of University College London. He regularly exhibited in London at many galleries, including the Goupil Galleries and the Chenil Gallery in Chelsea, and with Vanessa Bell’s Friday Club where he was a founding member, was invited to become a member of the New English Art Club in 1911, and in 1913 had works shown at the renowned Armory Show (the first International Exhibition of Modern Art) in New York, Boston and Chicago.

He was a friend of Augustus John and James Dickson Innes and from late 1910 to 1913, painted with them in north Wales, then again with Augustus John in 1914. In 1910, accompanied by Innes and another Slade colleague, Lees went on a painting trip to Collioure in France. He returned to southern France another three times prior to WWI, developing a distinctive highly coloured style following the influence of the post-impressionists.

Lees married his model-muse, Edith Harriet Price (1890-1984), in the summer of 1913. Under the artist-model pseudonym "Lyndra", she was one of Lees's and Augustus John's principal pre-WWI models.

His artistic career was curtailed by poverty and subsequent mental health problems, which saw him confined to asylums, initially in 1918, then permanently from 1919 until his death in 1931 at West Park Hospital, Epsom.

In 1936 his work 'Dorset Scene' was exhibited posthumously at the Venice Biennale, probably by his widow, as Great Britain did not contribute any works that year due to political tensions.

His works are held in more than 50 public institutions across eight countries in :

- the USA at the Yale Center for British Art, the Chicago Institute of Art and the Rhode Island School of Design;
- the major galleries of the Midlands and North of England, and all of London’s major galleries including the Tate, the V&A, the British Museum and the National Portrait Gallery;
- the National Galleries of Canada, Wales, New Zealand and Australia, among other major public Australian and South African galleries.

The 2025 catalogue raisonné of Lees's oeuvre details over 450 works, nearly all produced in 12 intense creative years.

== Selected paintings ==
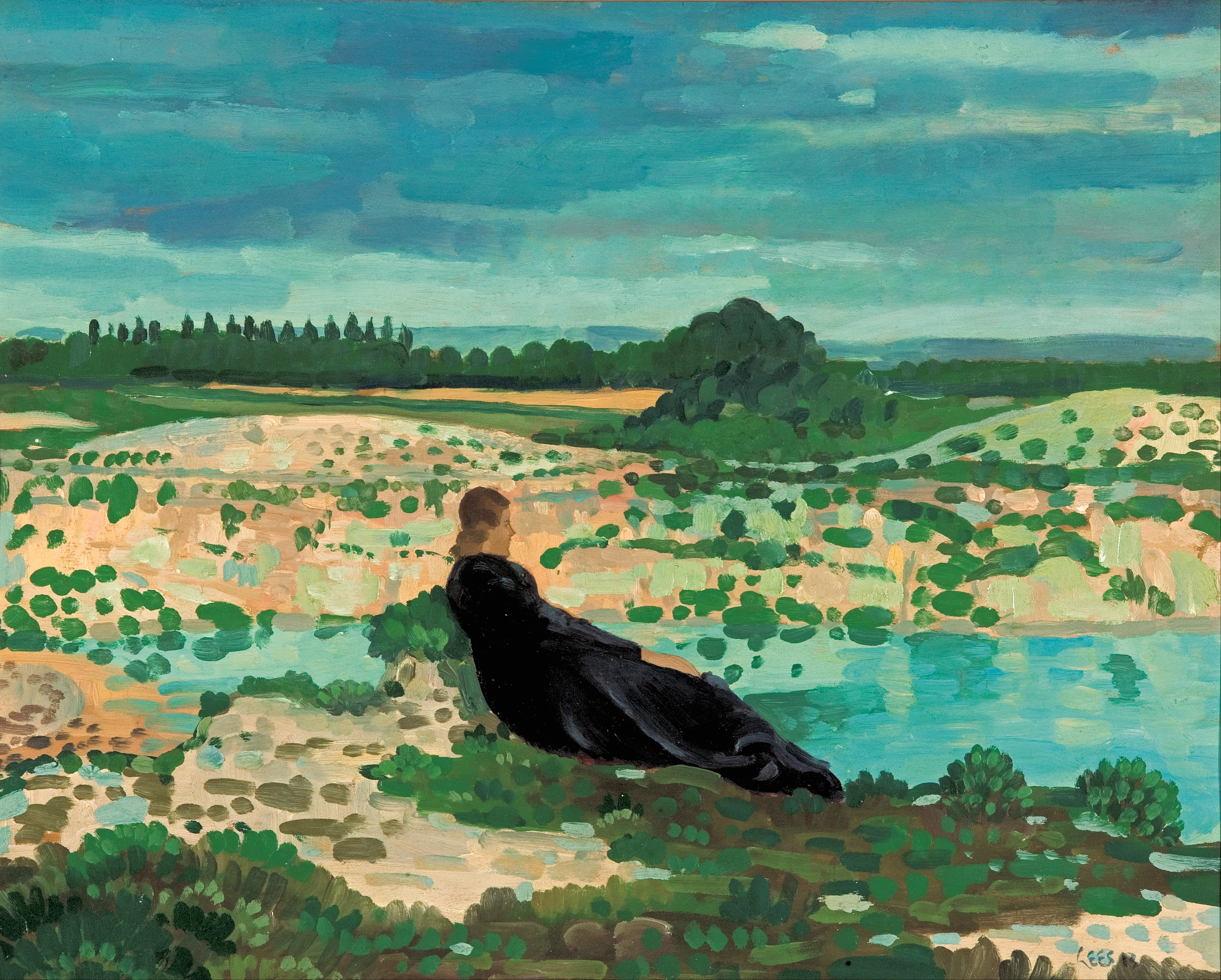
Lyndra by the Blue Pool, Dorset (1913), Art Gallery of South Australia

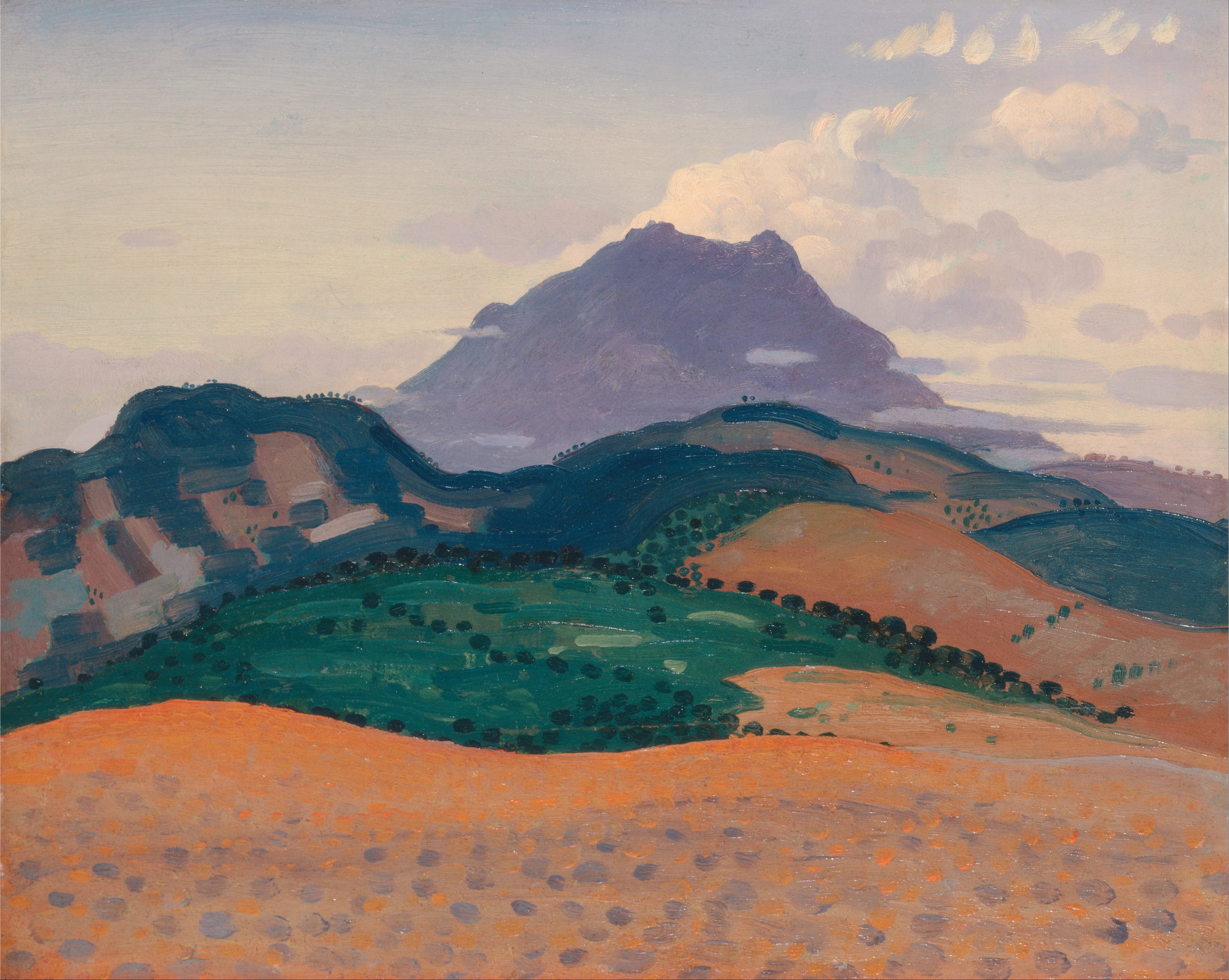
Tour Madeloc in the Pyrenees (c. 1913), Yale Center for British Art

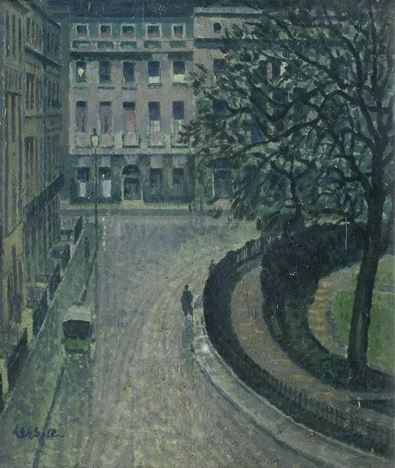
A London Square a.k.a. Fitzroy Square (1912)

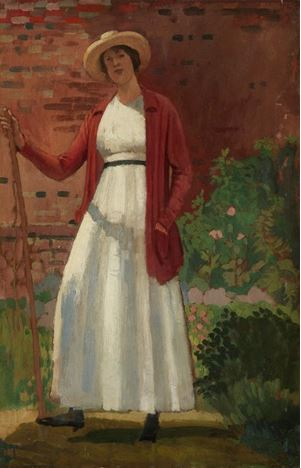
The Kitchen Garden a.k.a. Lyndra in a Garden (1913)

== Selected Works in Collections ==
Title	Year	Medium	Gallery no.	Catalogue Raisonné no.	Gallery	Location
Portrait of J. R. Fothergill, Esq.	1907	Red chalk on paper	LDUCS-6016	DL07.26	University College London Art Museum	London, England
Portrait of a Girl with Long Hair	1909	Pencil on paper	2:0413	DL09.27	Gallery of Modern Art]	Brisbane, Australia
Landscape at Collioure	1910	Watercolour & gouache on paper	N04241	DL10.16	Tate Gallery	London, England
Snow on Welsh Mountains a.k.a. Welsh Landscape in Winter	c.1911	Oil on wood panel	1951.1086	DL11.2	Glynn Vivian Art Gallery	Swansea, Wales
Evening	1911	Oil on canvas	9684	DL11.6	Government Art Collection	London, England
Essil Elmslie Reading a.k.a. Woman reading	1911	Pencil, ink & pen on paper	79.1516	DL11.52	National Gallery of Australia	Canberra, Australia
Mas Reig, Banyuls a.k.a. Spanish Landscape	1912	Oil on wood panel	76.359	DL12.24	National Gallery of Australia	Canberra, Australia
Métairie des Abeilles	1912	Oil on wood	N05355	DL12.26	Tate Gallery	London, England
The Round Hill, Banyales a.k.a. Spanish Landscape	1912	Oil on board	H1990.24	DL12.32	Brighton and Hove Museums	Brighton, England
Pear Tree in Blossom	1913	Oil on wood	N05021	DL13.6	Tate Gallery	London, England
Portrait of Lyndra, the Artist's Wife	1913	Pencil & paper & board	H1981.7	DL13.23	Brighton and Hove Museums	Brighton, England
Lyndra in a Landscape	1913	Oil on wood panel	1821-4	DL13.33	National Gallery of Victoria	Melbourne, Australia
Lyndra at the Pool	1913	Oil on wood panel	76.358	DL13.36	National Gallery of Australia	Canberra, Australia
The Blue Pool a.k.a. Reflections in Water	1913	Oil on wood panel	1930.77	DL13.45	Manchester Art Gallery	Manchester, England
Tan-Y-Bwlch a.k.a. The Yellow Skirt	1914	Oil on wood panel	127080	DL14.34	Carrick Hill	Adelaide, Australia
Lyndra by the Pool	1914	Oil on wood panel	1937.731	DL14.36	Manchester Art Gallery	Manchester, England
Girl in a Black Hat	1914	Oil on wood panel	1888-4	DL14.41	National Gallery of Victoria	Melbourne, Australia
Lyndra in Wales	1914	Oil on paper	2450	DL14.44	Fitzwilliam Museum	Cambridge, England
Not titled [Portrait study: Woman with head turned to the right]	1915-1918	Brush & ink & pencil on paper	79.15153	DL15.4	National Gallery of Australia	Canberra, Australia
Self Portrait	1919	Etching	D5046	DL19.1	National Portrait Gallery	London, England
