= Gene Carr (cartoonist) =

American cartoonist (1881–1959)

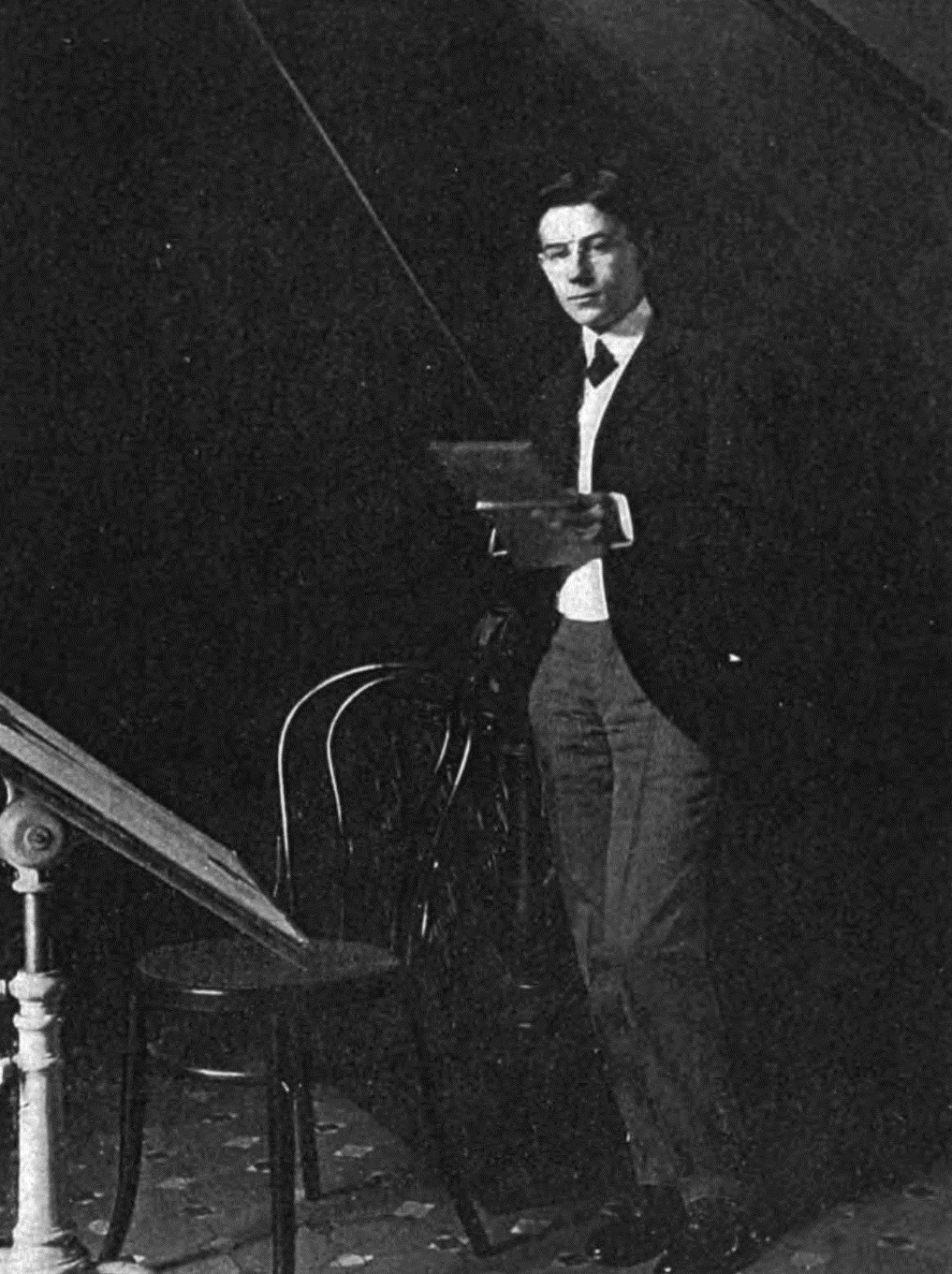
- Born: January 7, 1881 New York City, U.S.
- Died: December 9, 1959 (aged 78)
- Area: Syndicated cartoonist
- Notable works: Lady Bountiful (1902–1929)

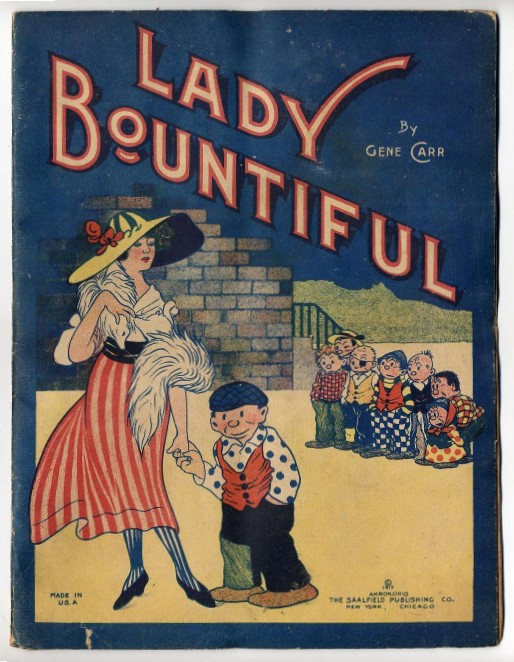
Gene Carr's Lady Bountiful (shown here in 1916).

Gene Carr (January 7, 1881 – December 9, 1959) was an American cartoonist.

Carr was one of the most active early New York City artists in the young field of comic strips. He was doing newspaper cartoons by age 15 and two years later was working for the William Randolph Hearst papers. Carr is considered a pioneer of the use of sequential panels. He did cartoons for the New York Herald, New York World and the New York Evening Journal.

Carr's comic strip Lady Bountiful, debuted in Heart's newspapers in 1902 as a Sunday-comics filler, and the following year jumped to publisher Joseph Pulitzer's The New York World, appearing as the cover feature of May 3, 1903. The strip's star, notes comics scholar Don Markstein, "has been cited by many comics historians and commentators as the very first" female protagonist of a comic strip, cautioning, "Maybe she is. It's certainly difficult to think of any that were in print before her 1902 debut." The strip also featured the first known appearance of grawlix.

Carr is the father of illustrator Cléanthe Carr.

== Bibliography ==
=== Comic strips and panels ===
==== For the Hearst Syndicate ====
- Lady Bountiful (launched in 1902; moved to New York World in 1903)

==== For The New York World ====
- Bill and the Jones Boys (1905) — Sunday strip
- Buddy's Baby Sister (1913) — Sunday strip
- Dearie (1910) — Sunday strip
- Duddy's Baby Sister (1913) — Sunday strip
- Everyday Movies (1921–1924; strip taken over by Denys Wortman) — gag panel
- Home Sweet Home (1907–1908) — Sunday strip
- Kitty Kildare (1921)
- Lady Bountiful (1903–1905, 1915–1918)
- Little Darling (1920–1921)
- Major Stuff (1914–1915) — Sunday strip
- Mr. Al Most (1911-1912) — Sunday strip
- Pansy's Pal (1920)
- Phyllis (1903-1906) — Sunday strip
- Poor Mr. W (1917–1920)
- The Prodigal Son (1906–1907) — Sunday strip
- Reddy and Caruso (1907) — Sunday strip
- Romeo (1905-1907) — Sunday strip
- Step-Brothers (1907-1914) — Sunday strip

=== Books ===
Carr's cartoons also appeared in reprint books and on postcards.
