= Harry Grant Dart =

American cartoonist and illustrator

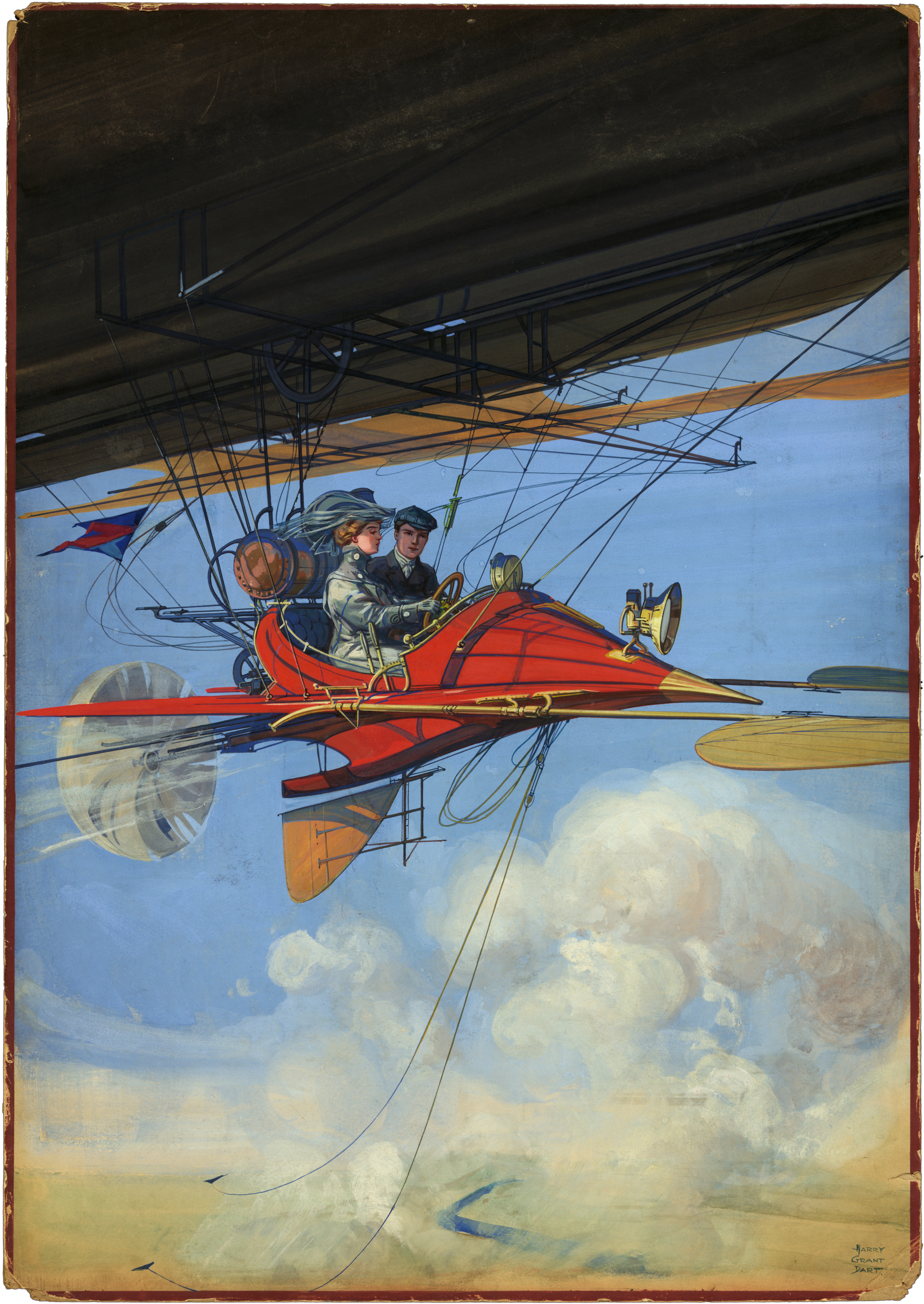
Cover illustration by Harry Grant Dart for the magazine The All-Story (October 1908)

Harry Grant Dart (November 3, 1868 – November 15, 1938) was an American cartoonist and illustrator known for his futuristic and often aviation-oriented cartoons and comic strips.

His first jobs were brochures for the National Crayon Company and illustrations for the Boston Herald. His career took off when the New York World sent him to Cuba, where, in the days before news photography became commonplace, he became a sketch artist for important events. He rose to become the art editor for The World.

In 1908, Dart produced his comic strip The Explorigator. Intended as a rival for Winsor McCay's Little Nemo, The Explorigator concerned the flight of the eponymous airship, headed by a crew of children ages 9–10: Admiral Fudge (who wore a swastika on his hat, years before the symbol became that of the Nazi Party), Detective Rubbersole, Maurice Mizzentop, Nicholas Nohooks, Grenadier Shift, Teddy Typewriter, and Ah Fergetit. The strip ran for 14 weeks in 1908.

Dart went on to become a prolific cartoonist, continuing with Boys Will Be Boys in 1909 and Life and Judge in the 1910s and 1920s.

He died in Laconia, New Hampshire, in 1938.
