= John Noble (disambiguation) =

John Noble (born 1948) is an Australian actor and theatre director.

John Noble may also refer to:

- John Noble (MP), Member of Parliament for Old Sarum in 1417
- John Willock Noble (1831–1912), U.S. Secretary of the Interior
- John Noble (painter) (1874–1934), American post-Impressionist painter
- John H. Noble (1923–2007), U.S.-born author, part owner of Praktica Camera company, survivor of Soviet concentration camps
- John Noble (baritone) (1931–2008), English baritone
- John Noble (bishop) (born 1944), Australian Anglican bishop
- John Noble (rugby union), former South African rugby union player
- John Noble (Dean of Exeter), Dean of Exeter between 1274 and 1280
- John Noble (publisher) (died 1797), bookseller and publisher in London
- John Noble (cricketer) (1845–1889), English cricketer
- John Noble (footballer) (born 1997), Australian rules footballer
- John W. Noble (1880–1946), American film director and screenwriter
- John A. Noble (1913–1983), American artist
- John Noble (privateer) (died 1574), English pirate
