= Ashcan School =

American art movement

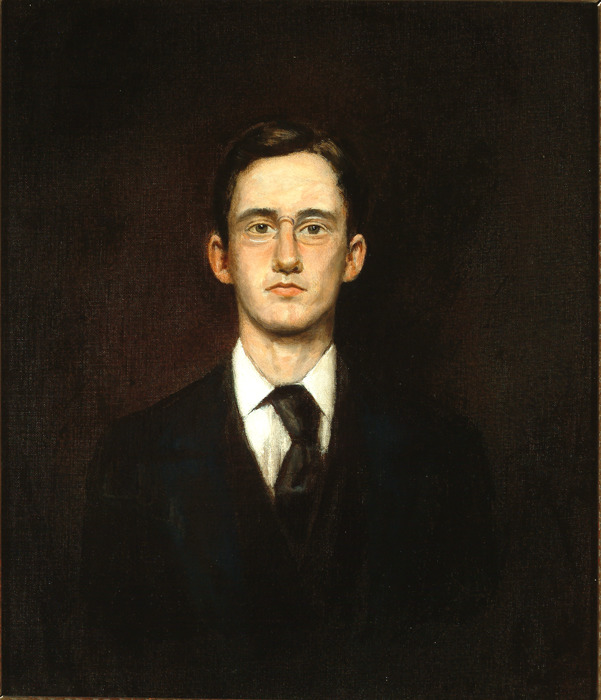
John French Sloan, Self-portrait, 1890, oil on window shade, 14 × 11 7/8 inches, Delaware Art Museum, gift of Helen Farr Sloan, 1970. John Sloan was a leading member of the Ashcan School.

The Ashcan School, also called the Ash Can School, was an artistic movement in the United States during the late 19th-early 20th century that produced works portraying scenes of daily life in New York, often in the city's poorer neighborhoods. The movement, which took some inspiration from Walt Whitman's 1855 epic poem Leaves of Grass, has been seen as emblematic of the spirit of political rebellion of the period.

The artists working in this style included Robert Henri, George Luks, William Glackens, John Sloan, and Everett Shinn. Some of them met studying together under the realist Thomas Anshutz at the Pennsylvania Academy of the Fine Arts; others met in the newspaper offices of Philadelphia where they worked as illustrators. Theresa Bernstein, who studied at the Philadelphia School of Design for Women, was also a part of the Ashcan School. She was friends with many of its better-known members, including Sloan with whom she co-founded the Society of Independent Artists.

== Origin and development ==
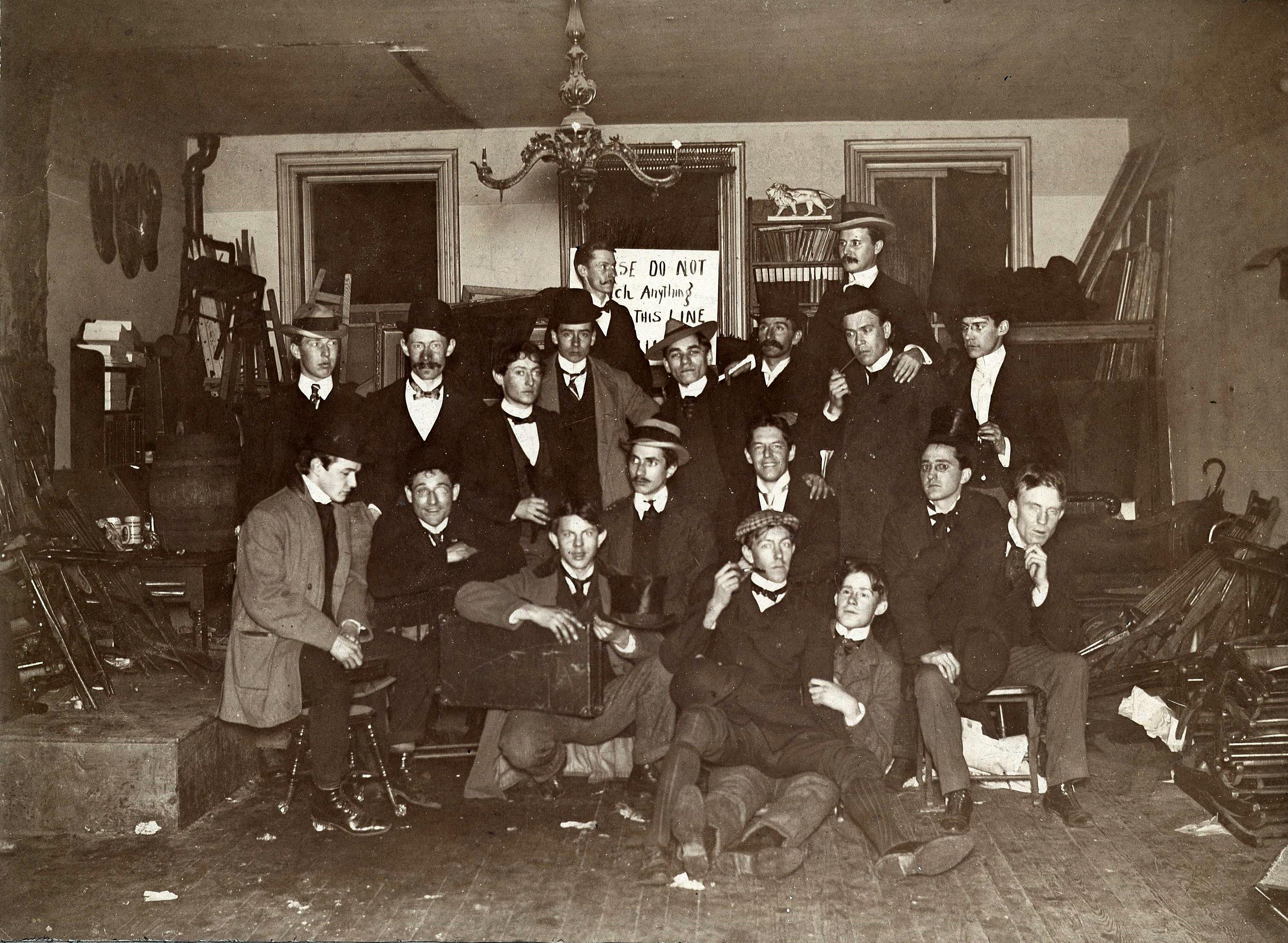
Ashcan School artists and friends at John French Sloan's Philadelphia Studio, 1898

The Ashcan School was not an organized movement. The artists who worked in this style did not issue manifestos or even see themselves as a unified group with identical intentions or career goals. Some of the artists were politically minded, and others were apolitical. Their unity consisted of a desire to tell certain truths about the city and modern life they felt had been ignored by the suffocating influence of the Genteel Tradition in the visual arts. Robert Henri, in some ways the spiritual father of this school, "wanted art to be akin to journalism... he wanted paint to be as real as mud, as the clods of horse-shit and snow, that froze on Broadway in the winter." He urged his younger friends and students to paint in the robust, unfettered, ungenteel spirit of his favorite poet, Walt Whitman, and to be unafraid of offending contemporary taste. He believed that working-class and middle-class urban settings would provide better material for modern painters than drawing rooms and salons. In the mid-1890s Henri returned to Philadelphia from Paris very unimpressed by the work of the late Impressionists and with a determination to create a type of art that engaged with life. He attempted to imbue several other artists with this passion. Henri admired the works of Édouard Manet, and he urged his students to ‘’paint the everyday world in America just as it had been done in France.’’ By 1904, all of the artists relocated to New York.

The name "Ashcan school" is a tongue-in-cheek reference to other "schools of art". (For examples of other "schools of art" see Category:Italian art movements e.g. Lucchese School and for instance School of Paris.) Its origin is in a complaint found in a radical socialist publication called The Masses in March 1916 by cartoonist Art Young, alleging that there were too many "pictures of ashcans and girls hitching up their skirts on Horatio Street." That particular reference was published in The Masses at a point at which the artists had already been working together for several years. They were amused by the reference, and the name soon lost its negative connotations. The Ashcan School of artists had also been known as "The Apostles of Ugliness". The term Ashcan School was originally applied in derision. The school is not so much known for innovations in technique but more for its subject matter. Common subjects were prostitutes and street urchins. The work of the Ashcan painters links them to such documentary photographers as Jacob Riis and Lewis W. Hine. Several Ashcan School painters derived from the area of print publication at a time before photography replaced hand-drawn illustrations in newspapers. They were involved in journalistic pictorial reportage before concentrating their energies on painting. George Luks once proclaimed "I can paint with a shoestring dipped in pitch and lard." The school has even been referred to as "the revolutionary black gang", a reference to the artists' dark palette. The group was subject to attacks in the press and one of their earliest exhibitions, in 1908 at New York's Macbeth Gallery, was a success. Since then to 1913, they would go on to participate in several key exhibitions of progressive art in New York.

Many of the most famous Ashcan works were painted in the first decade of the century at the same time in which the realist fiction of Stephen Crane, Theodore Dreiser, and Frank Norris was finding its audience and the muckraking journalists were calling attention to slum conditions. The first known use of the term "ash can art" is credited to artist Art Young in 1916. The term by that time was applied to a large number of painters beyond the original "Philadelphia Five," including George Bellows, Glenn O. Coleman, Jerome Myers, Gifford Beal, Eugene Higgins, Carl Sprinchorn and Edward Hopper. (Despite his inclusion in the group by some critics, Hopper rejected their focus and never embraced the label; his depictions of city streets were painted in a different spirit, "with not a single incidental ashcan in sight.") Photographers like Jacob Riis and Lewis Hine were also discussed as Ashcan artists. Like many art-historical terms, "Ashcan art" has sometimes been applied to so many different artists that its meaning has become diluted.

The artists of the Ashcan School rebelled against both American Impressionism and academic realism, the two most respected and commercially successful styles in the US at the end of the 19th century and the beginning of the 20th century. In contrast to the highly polished work of artists like John Singer Sargent, William Merritt Chase, Kenyon Cox, Thomas Wilmer Dewing, and Abbott Thayer, Ashcan works were generally darker in tone and more roughly painted. Many captured the harsher moments of modern life, portraying street kids (e.g., Henri's Willie Gee and Bellows' Paddy Flannagan), prostitutes (e.g., Sloan's The Haymarket and Three A.M.), alcoholics (e.g., Luks' The Old Duchess), indecorous animals (e.g., Luks' Feeding the Pigs and Woman with Goose), subways (e.g., Shinn's Sixth Avenue Elevated After Midnight), crowded tenements (e.g., Bellows' Cliff Dwellers), washing hung out to dry (Shinn's The Laundress and Sloan's A Woman's Work), boisterous theaters (e.g., Glackens' Hammerstein's Roof Garden and Shinn's London Hippodrome), bloodied boxers (e.g., Bellows' Both Members of This Club), and wrestlers on the mat (e.g., Luks' The Wrestlers). It was their frequent, although not exclusive, focus upon poverty and the gritty realities of urban life that prompted some critics and curators to consider them too unsettling for mainstream audiences and collections.

The advent of modernism in the United States spelled the end of the Ashcan school's provocative reputation. With the Armory Show of 1913 and the opening of more galleries in the 1910s promoting the work of Cubists, Fauves, and Expressionists, Henri and his circle began to appear tame to a younger generation. Their rebellion was over not long after it began. It was the fate of the Ashcan realists to be seen by many art lovers as too radical in 1910 and, by many more, as old-fashioned by 1920.

== Connection to "The Eight" ==
The Ashcan school is sometimes linked to the group known as "The Eight", though in fact only five members of that group (Henri, Sloan, Glackens, Luks, and Shinn) were Ashcan artists. The other three – Arthur B. Davies, Ernest Lawson, and Maurice Prendergast – painted in a very different style, and the exhibition that brought "The Eight" to national attention took place in 1908, several years after the beginning of the Ashcan style. However, the attention accorded the group's well-publicized exhibition at the Macbeth Galleries in New York 1908 was such that Ashcan art gained wider exposure and greater sales and critical attention than it had known before.

The Macbeth Galleries exhibition was held to protest the restrictive exhibition policies of the powerful, conservative National Academy of Design and to broadcast the need for wider opportunities to display new art of a more diverse, adventurous quality than the Academy generally permitted. When the exhibition closed in New York, where it attracted considerable attention, it toured Chicago, Toledo, Cincinnati, Indianapolis, Pittsburgh, Bridgeport, and Newark in a traveling show organized by John Sloan. Reviews were mixed, but interest was high. ("Big Sensation at the Art Museum, Visitors Join Throng Museum and Join Hot Discussion," one Ohio newspaper noted.) As art historian Judith Zilczer summarized the venture, "In taking their art directly to the American public, The Eight demonstrated that cultural provincialism in the United States was less pervasive than contemporary and subsequent accounts of the period had inferred." Sales and exhibition opportunities for these painters increased significantly in the ensuing years.

== Gallery ==
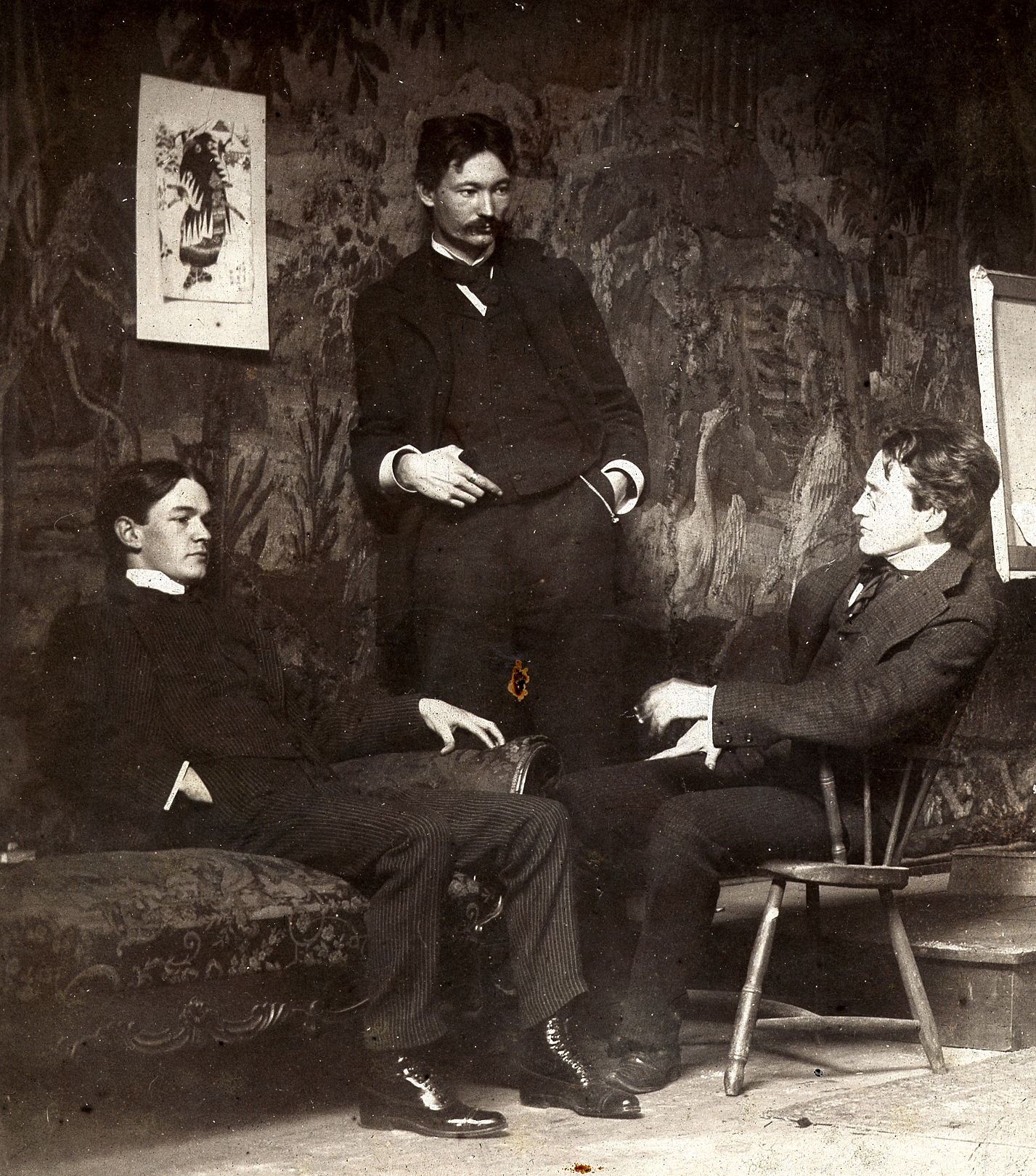
Ashcan School artists, c. 1896, left to right, Everett Shinn, Robert Henri, John French Sloan

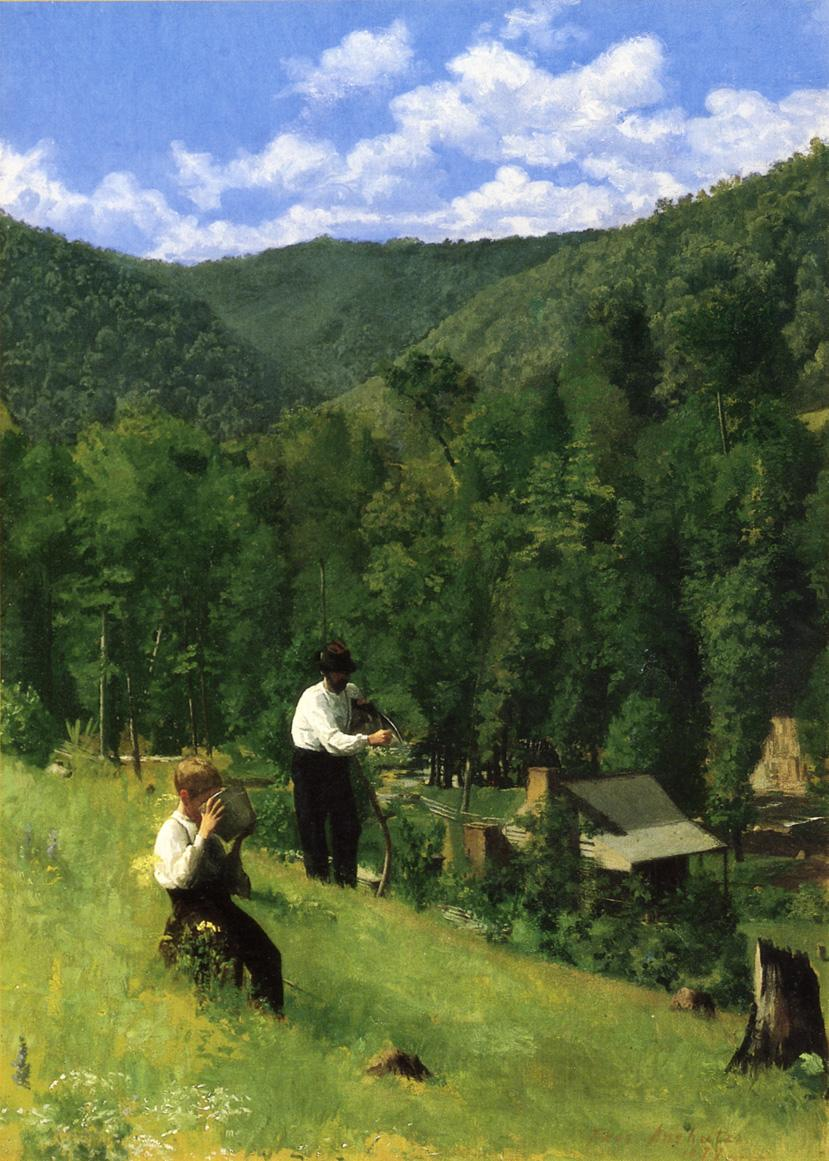
Thomas Pollock Anshutz, The Farmer and His Son at Harvesting, 1879. Five members of the Ashcan School studied with him, but went on to create quite different styles.

Robert Henri, Snow in New York, 1902, National Gallery of Art, Washington, DC

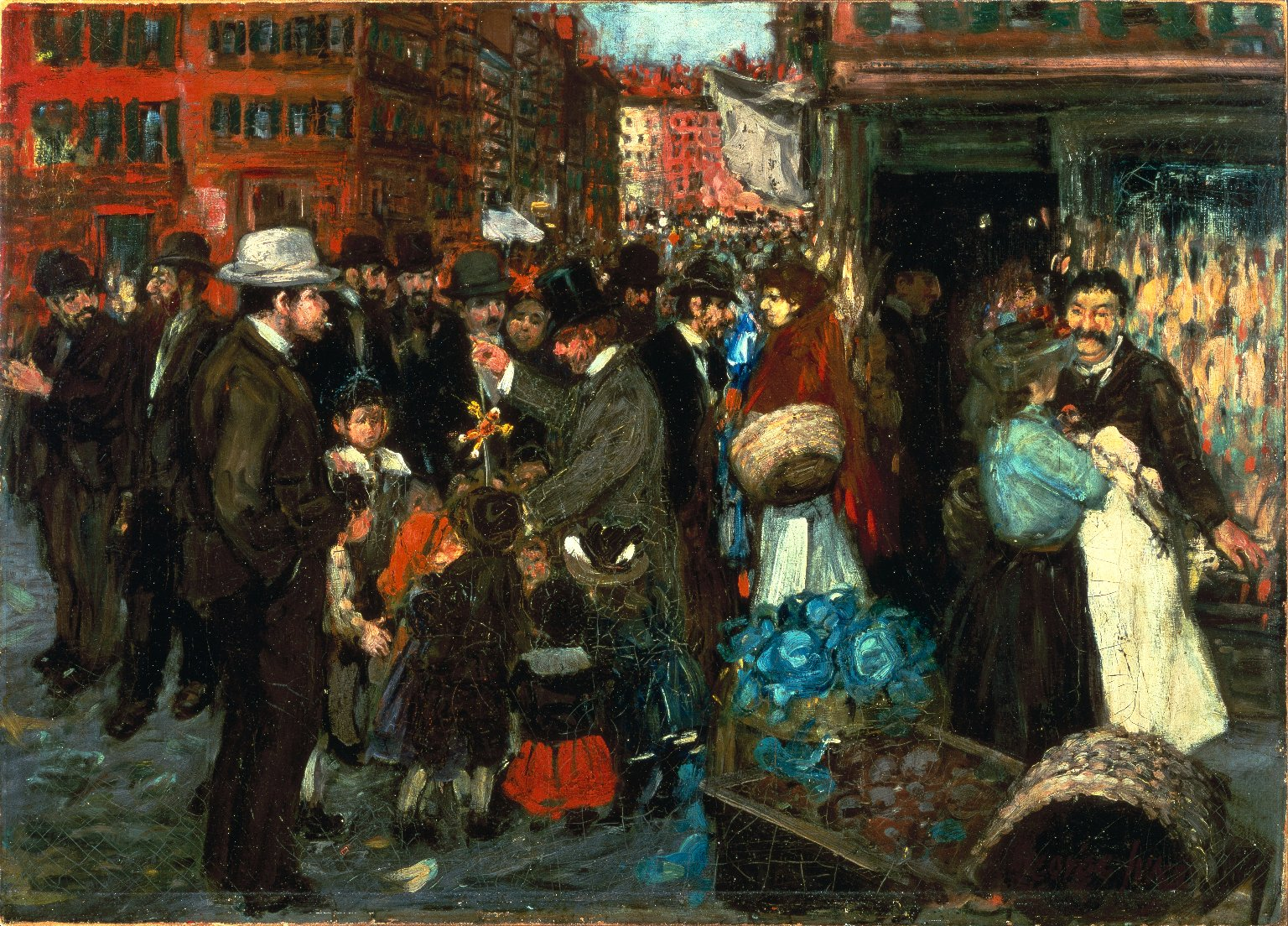
George Luks, Street Scene, 1905, Brooklyn Museum

Everett Shinn, Cross Streets of New York, 1899, Corcoran Gallery of Art, Washington, DC.

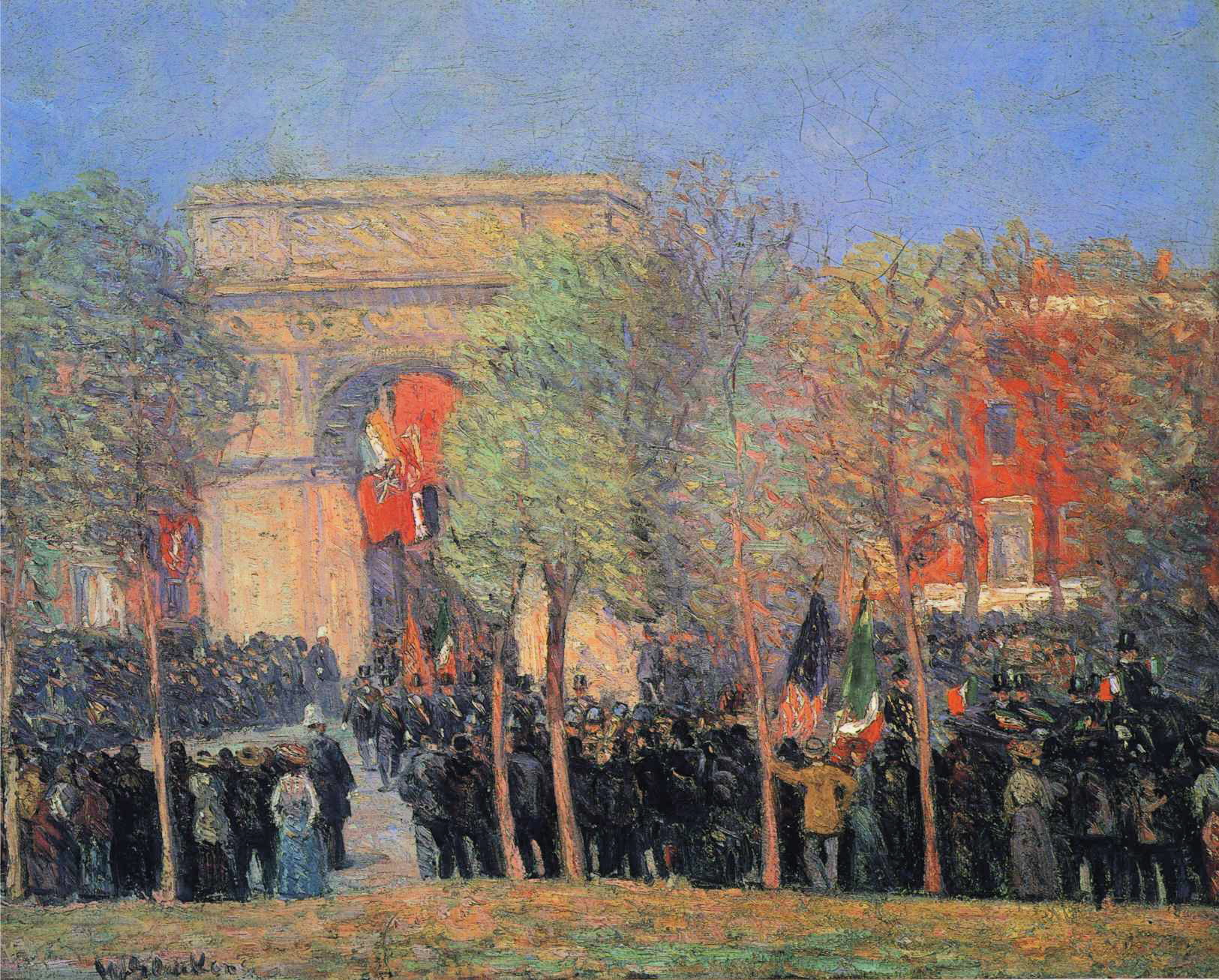
William Glackens, Italo-American Celebration, Washington Square, 1912, Boston Museum of Fine Arts

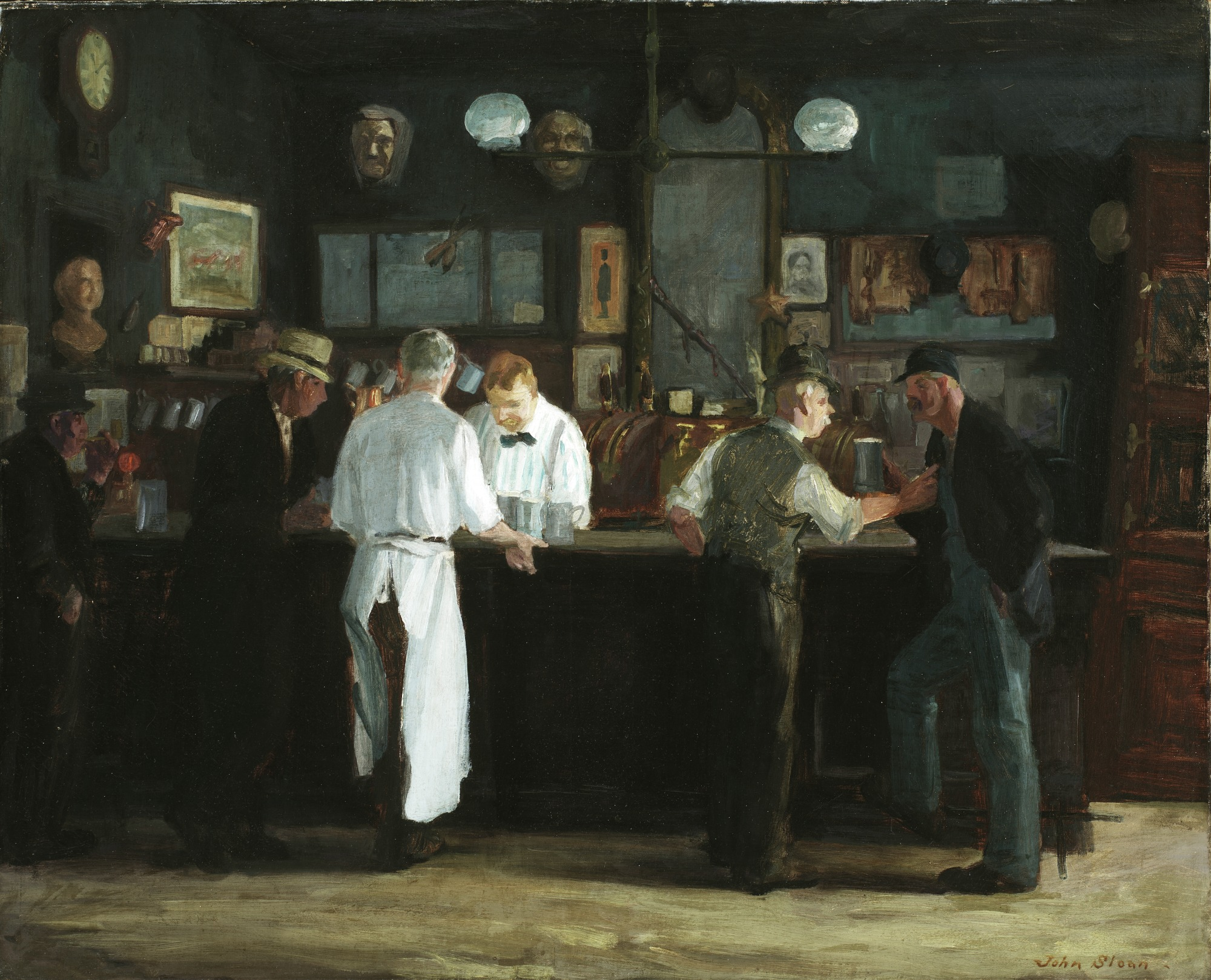
John French Sloan, McSorley's Bar, 1912, Detroit Institute of Arts

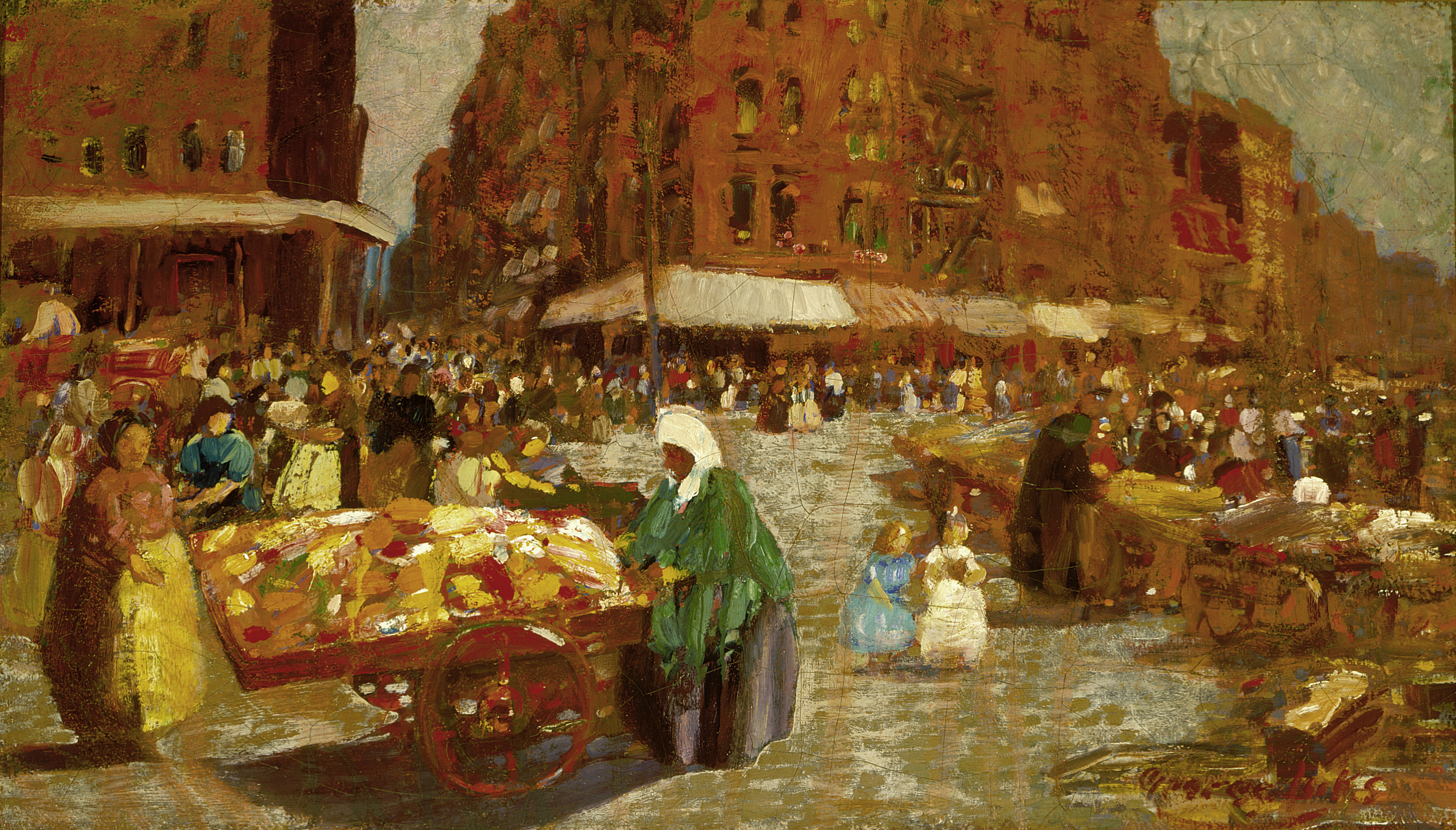
George Luks, Houston Street, 1917, oil on canvas, Saint Louis Art Museum

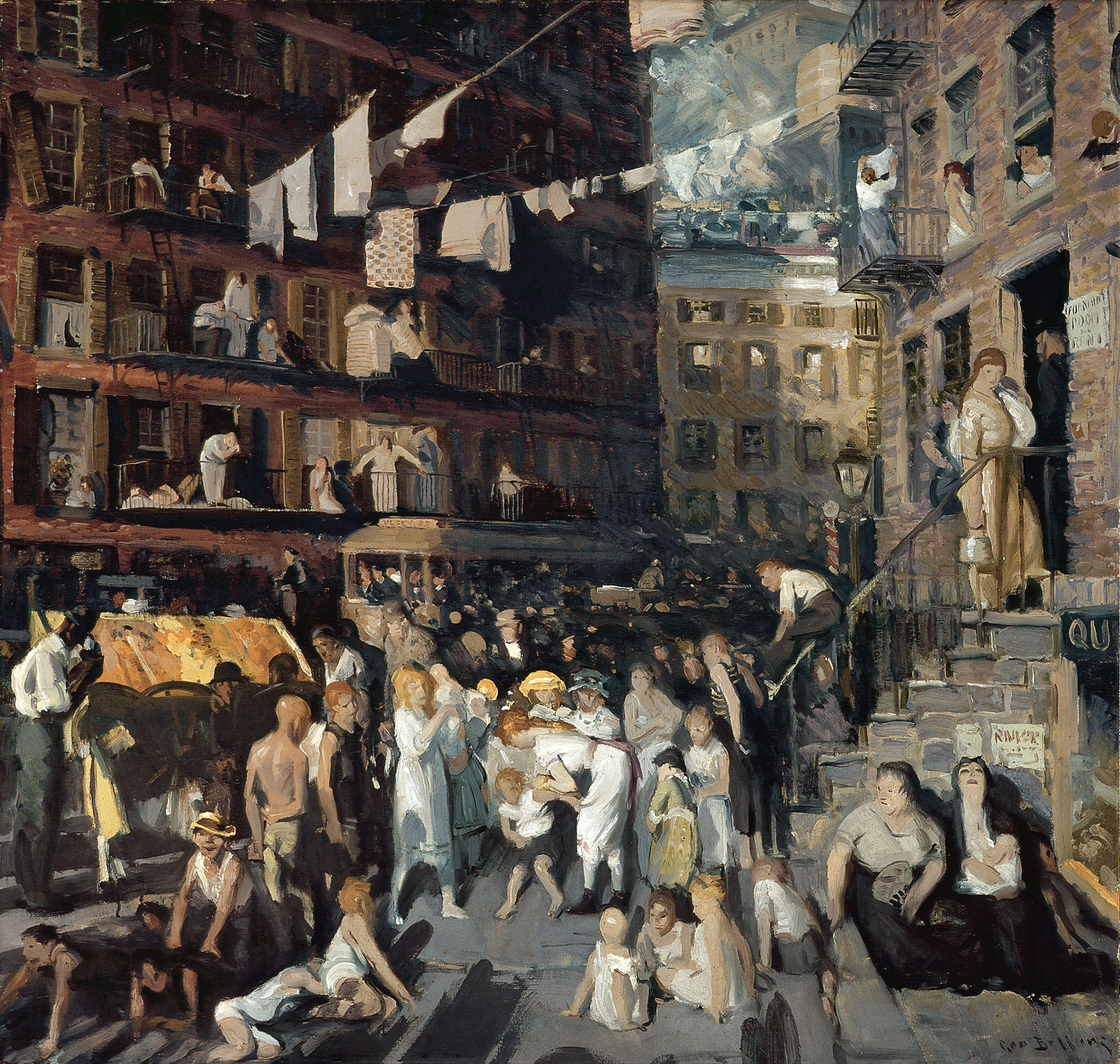
George Bellows, Cliff Dwellers, 1913, oil on canvas. Los Angeles County Museum of Art

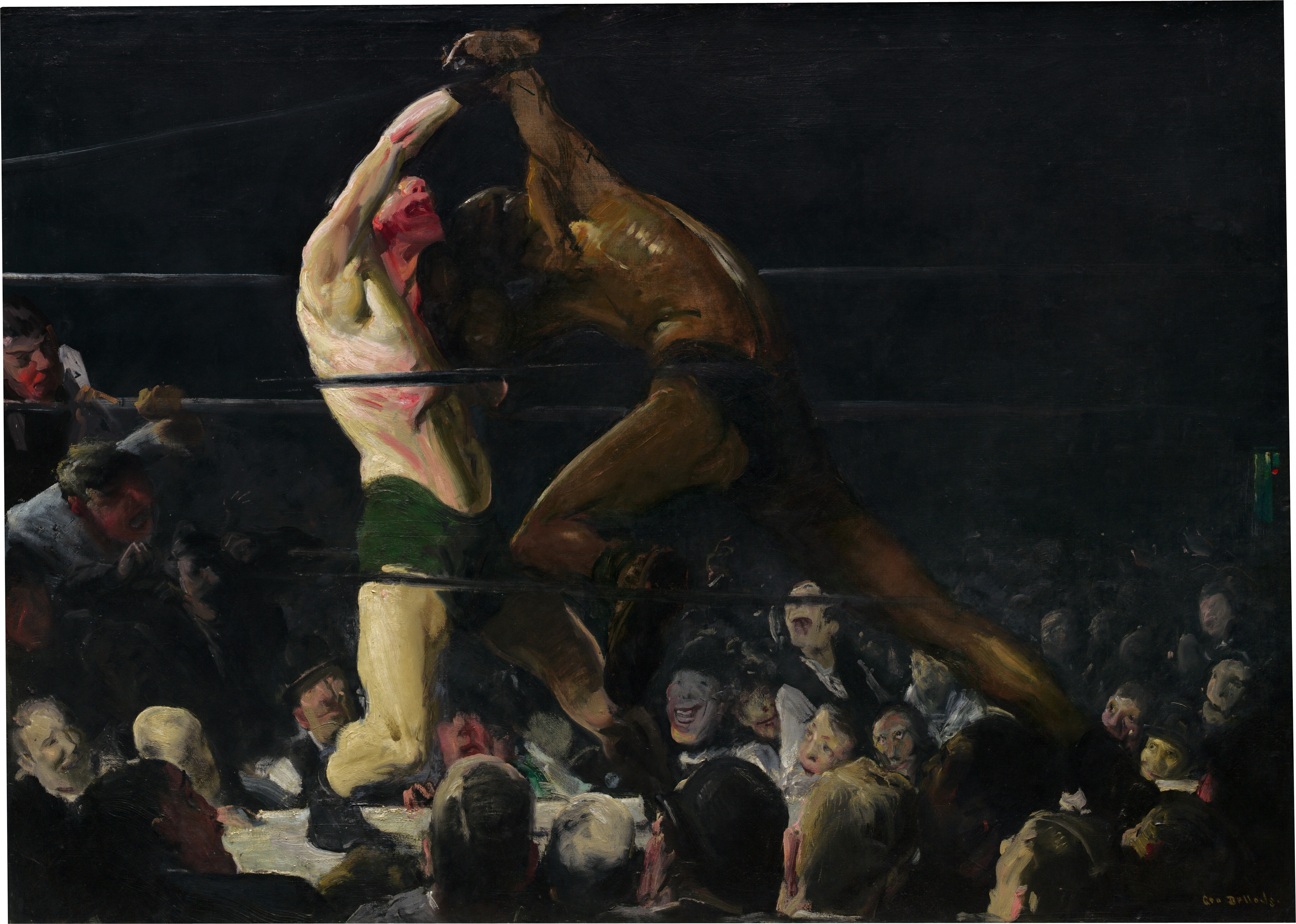
George Bellows, Both Members of This Club, 1909, National Gallery of Art. Bellows was a close associate of the Ashcan school and had studied under Robert Henri.

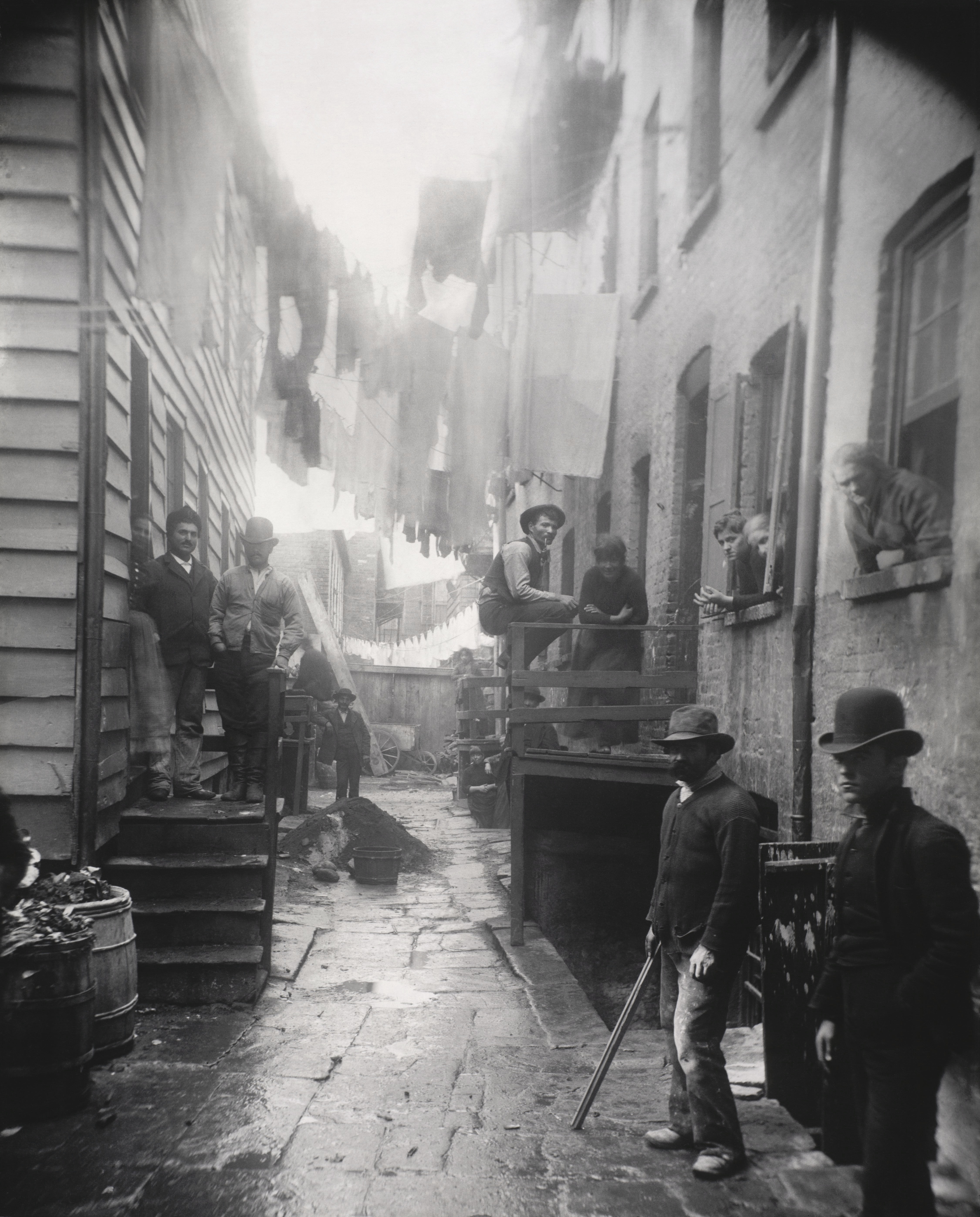
Jacob Riis, Bandit's Roost, 1888, (photo), considered the most crime-ridden, dangerous part of New York City.

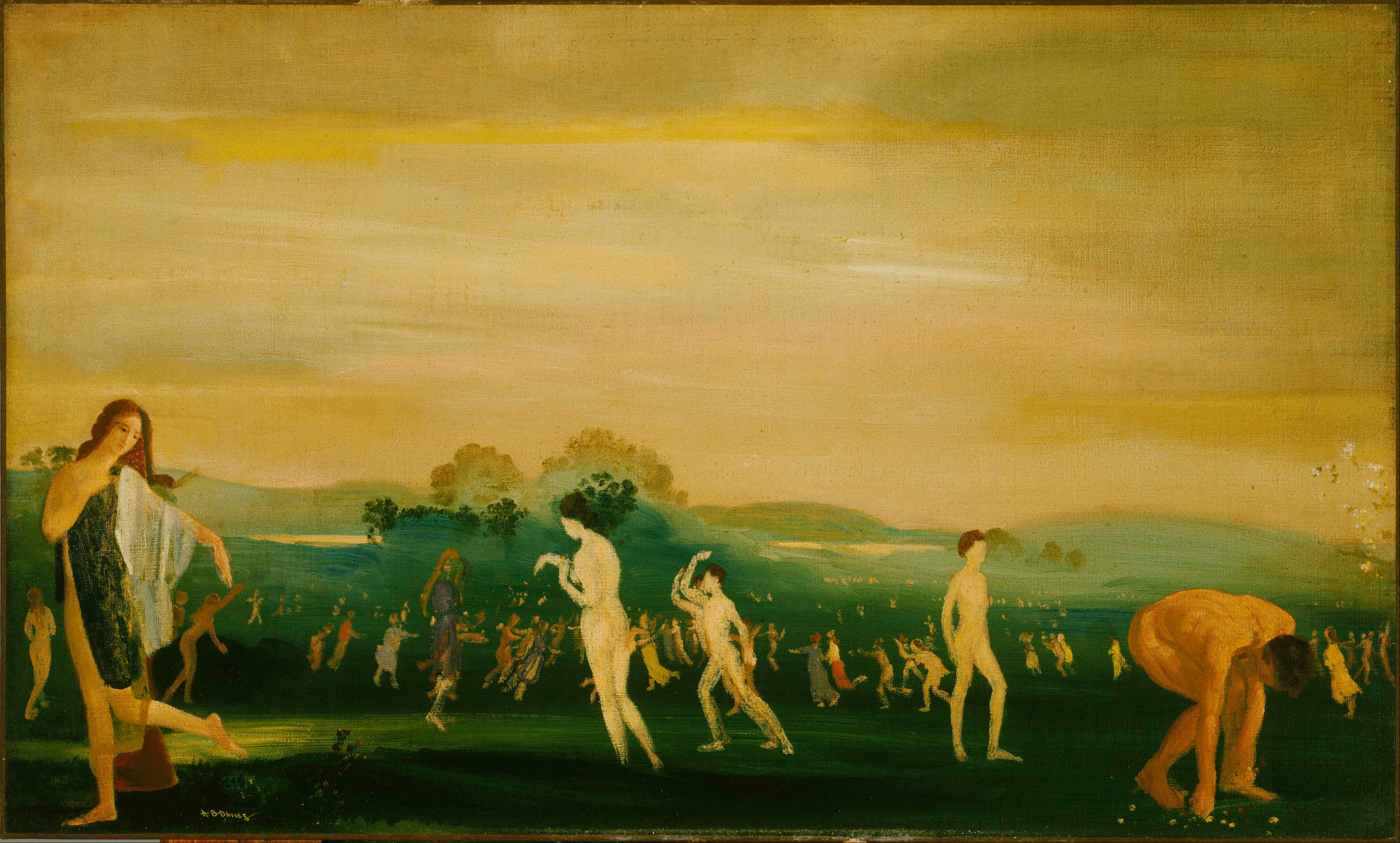
Arthur B. Davies, Elysian Fields, oil on canvas, The Phillips Collection Washington, DC.

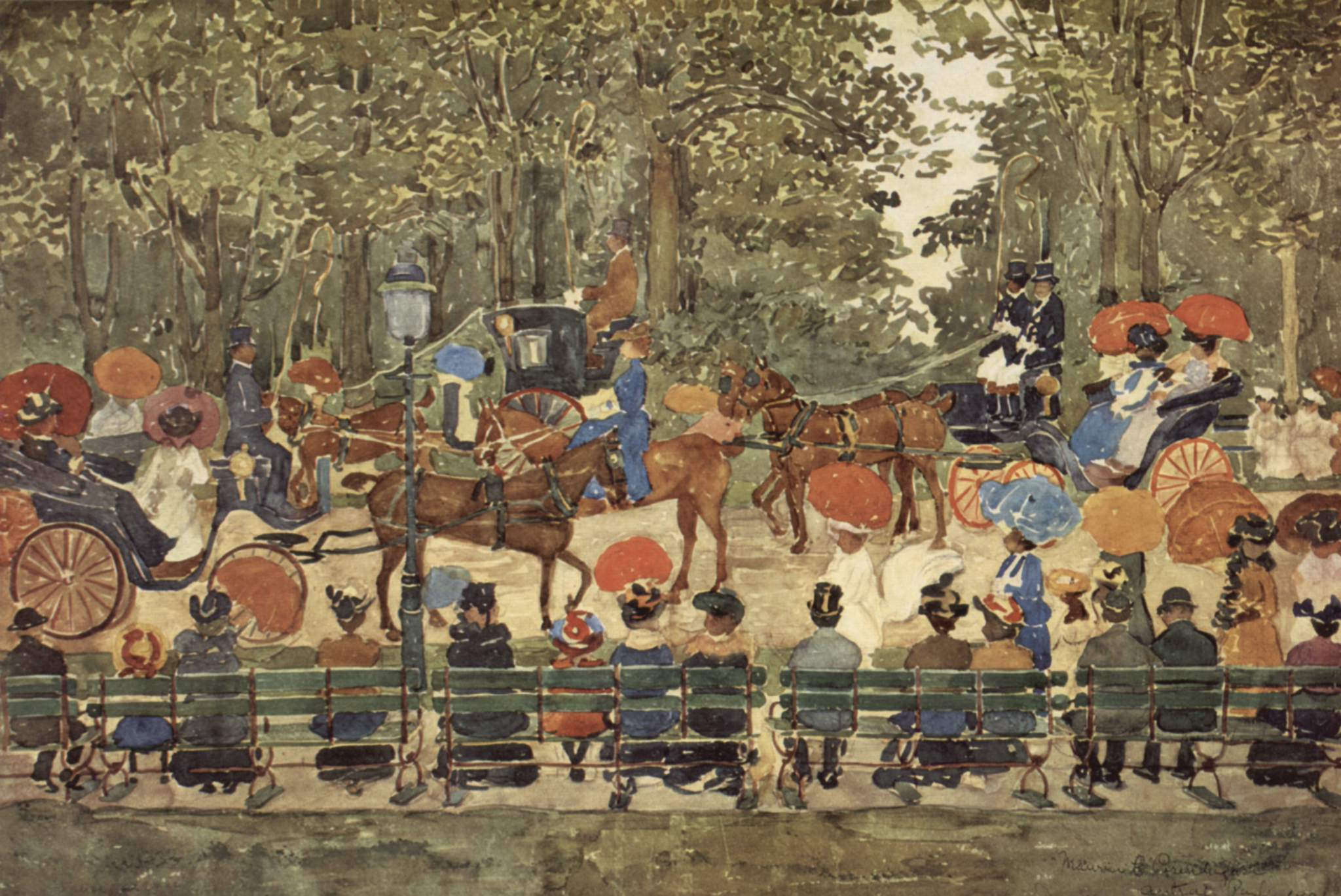
Maurice Prendergast, Central Park, New York, 1901, Whitney Museum of American Art

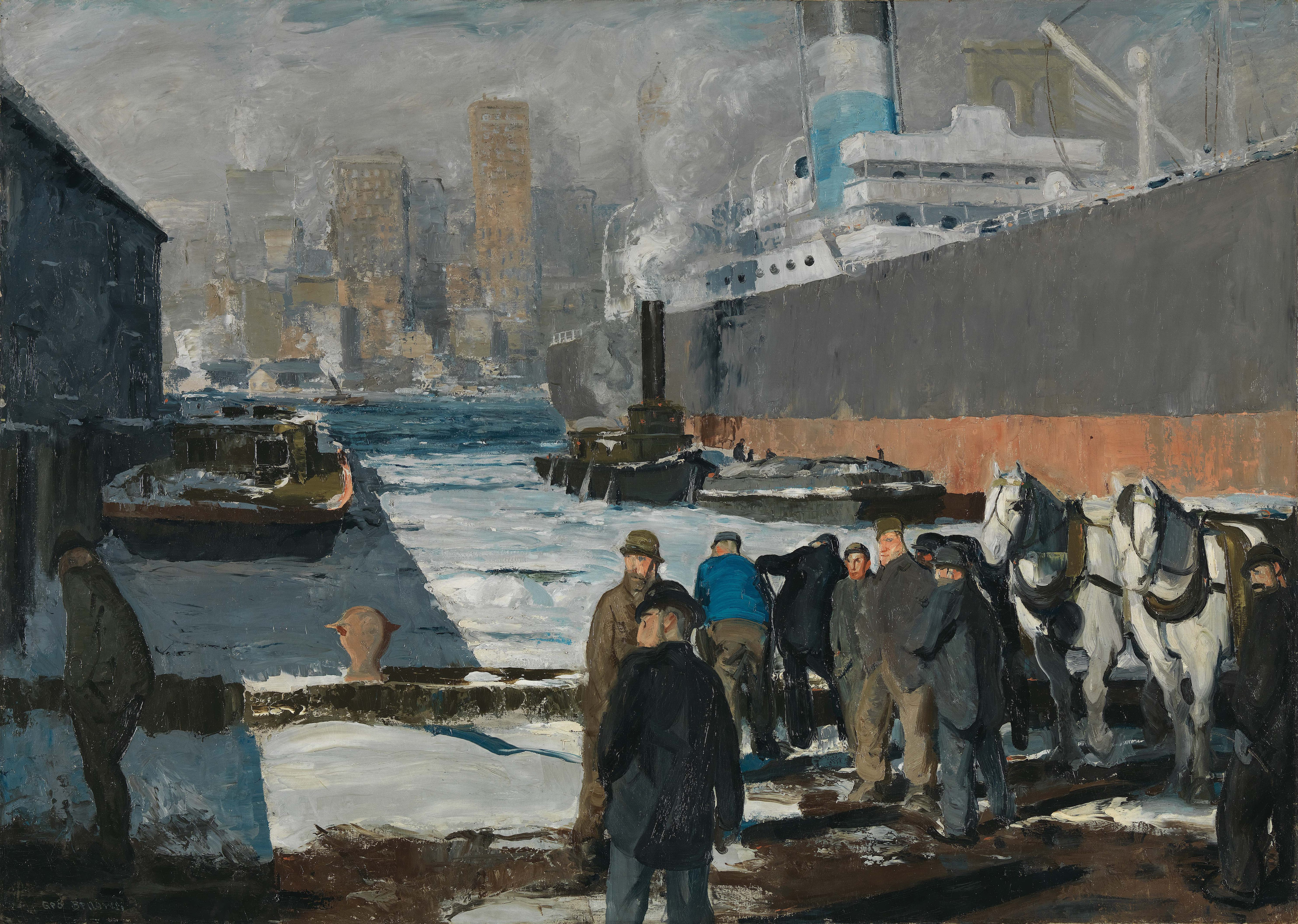
George Bellows, Men of the Docks, 1912, National Gallery, London

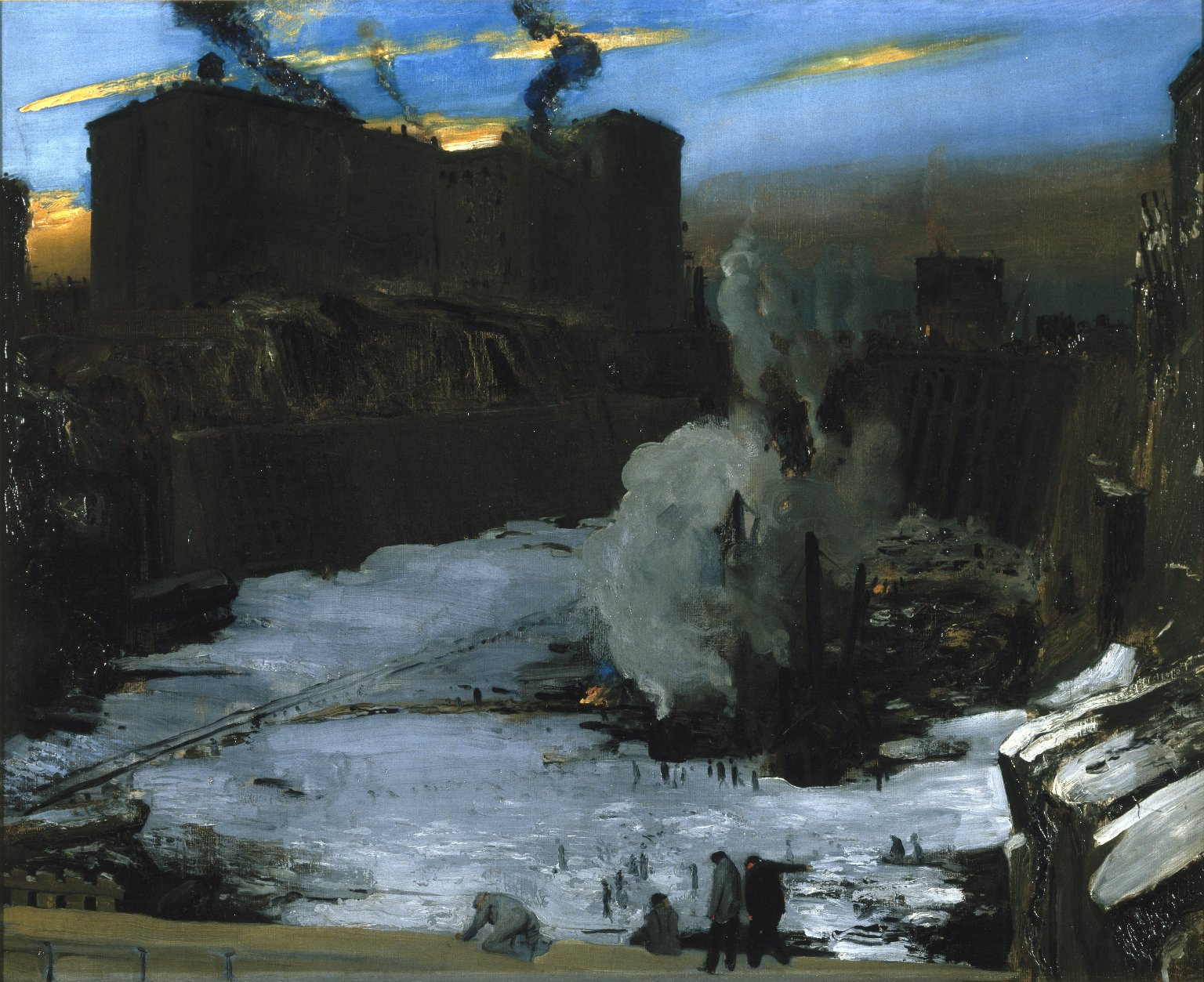
Pennsylvania Station Excavation by George Bellows, c. 1907–08, Brooklyn Museum

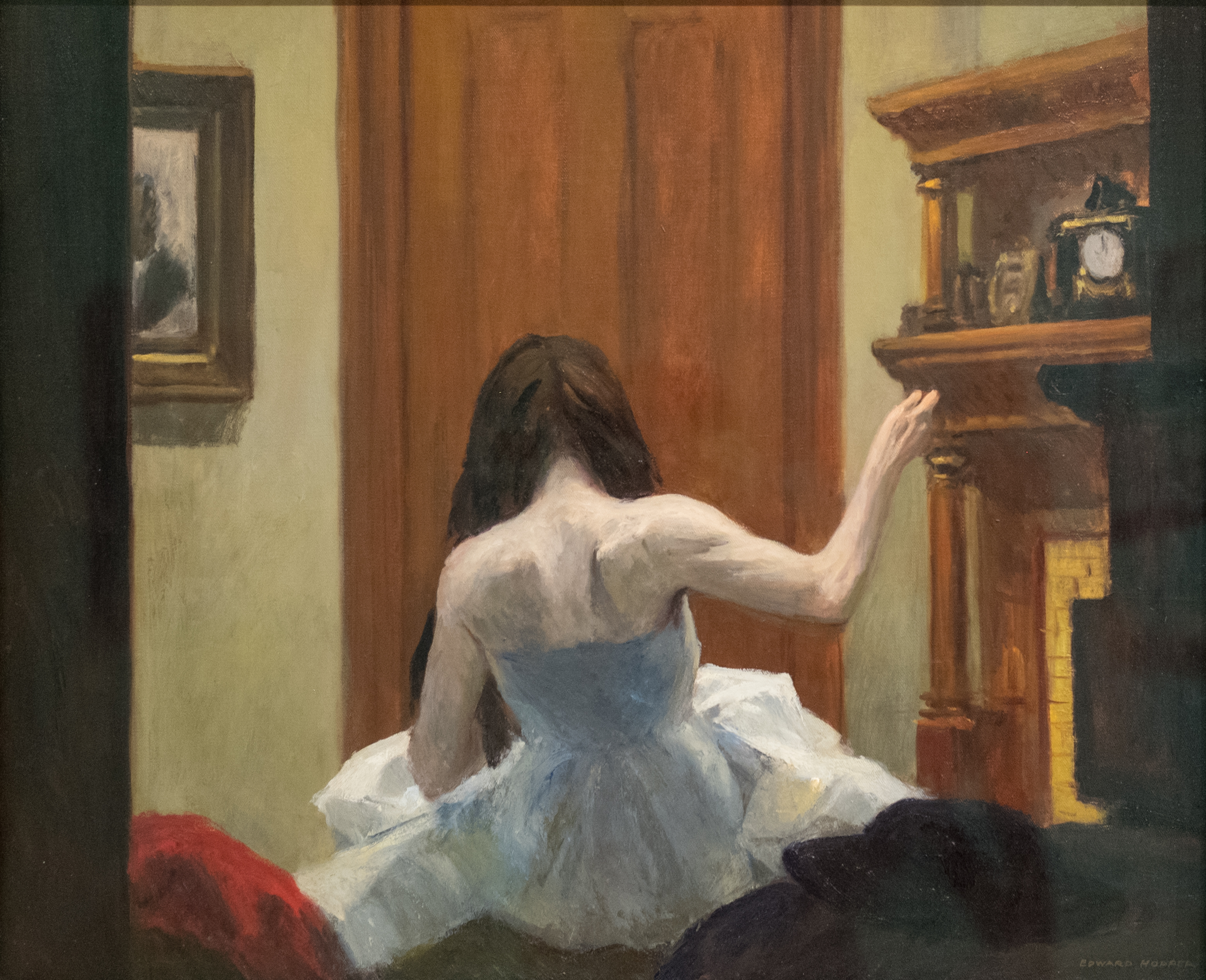
Edward Hopper, New York Interior, c. 1921, Whitney Museum of American Art
