= The Wrestlers (Luks) =

1905 painting by George Luks

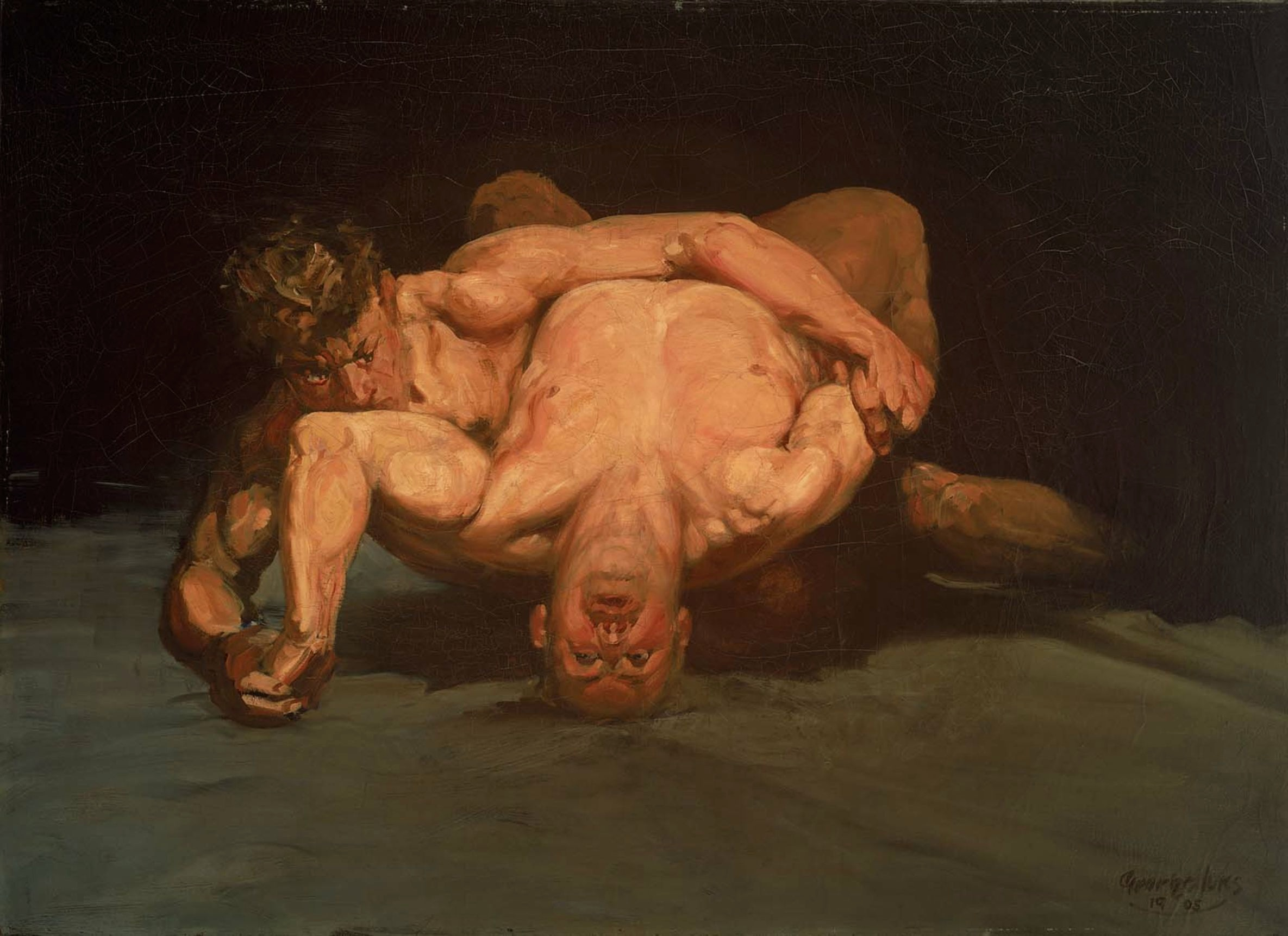
- Artist: George Luks
- Year: 1905
- Medium: Oil on canvas
- Subject: Two nude men wrestling
- Dimensions: 122.87 cm × 168.59 cm (48.37 in × 66.37 in)
- Location: Museum of Fine Arts; Boston
- Website: www.mfa.org/collections/object/the-wrestlers-32922

The Wrestlers is a 1905 oil painting by George Luks held at the Museum of Fine Arts, Boston in Massachusetts, United States. The Wrestlers is Luks' best-known work. The painting depicts two nude men wrestling. He painted it in order to shock members of the Pennsylvania Academy of the Fine Arts whom he called "pink-and-white idiots". The Wrestlers was displayed at the 1908 Ashcan School exhibition. A 1910 article in New York World about the Exhibition of Independent Artists included an image of Luks' The Wrestlers despite the fact that the painting did not appear in that exhibition. In a 1908 diary entry, painter John French Sloan writes that The Wrestlers is among the best paintings he ever encountered. In 1992, art critic Carol Clark identified The Wrestlers as one of Luks' best works, calling it "raw, roughly painted" and reflective of Luks' experiences in New York. In 1996, Allen Guttmann compared Luks' The Wrestlers to Thomas Eakins' Wrestlers and Max Slevogt's Wrestling School, writing that all three paintings depict pairs of nude wrestling men lying on the ground in grappling holds. In the 2009 Dictionary of Modern and Contemporary Art, Ian Chilvers and John Glaves-Smith write that The Wrestlers emulates the "bravura painterly technique of artists such as Manet".

== Bibliography ==
- Chilvers, Ian; John Glaves-Smith (2009). A Dictionary of Modern and Contemporary Art. Oxford University Press. ISBN 978-0199239658.
- Clark, Carol (1992). American Drawings and Watercolors. Metropolitan Museum of Art. ISBN 0870996398.
- D'Epiro, Peter; Mary Desmond Pinkowish (2010). What are the Seven Wonders of the World?. Random House. ISBN 978-0307491077.
- Doezema, Marianne (1992). George Bellows and Urban America. Yale University Press. ISBN 0300050437.
- Guttmann, Allen (1996). The Erotic in Sports. Columbia University Press. ISBN 0231105568.
- LaFeber, Walter; Richard Polenberg; Nancy Woloch (2015). The American Century: A History of the United States Since the 1890s. Routledge. ISBN 978-1317478409.
- Sloan, John French (2013). Bruce St. John; Herbert I. London (eds.). New York Scene: 1906-1913. Transaction Publishers. ISBN 978-1412842594.
- Souter, Gerry (2012). American Realism. Parkstone International. ISBN 978-1780429922.
