= John Noble (painter) =

American painter

- Born: March 15, 1874; Wichita, Kansas, U.S.
- Died: January 6, 1934 (aged 59); New York City, U.S.
- Other name: Wichita Bill
- Education: Art Academy of Cincinnati; Académie Julian
- Occupation: Painter
- Notable work: On the Marne (1927); The Big Herd (1928)
- Movement: Post-Impressionism
- Spouse: Amelia Peiche (m. 1909)
- Children: 2, including John A. Noble
- Awards: Carnegie Prize (1928)

John "Wichita Bill" Noble (March 15, 1874 – January 6, 1934) was an American painter. He was a noted post-impressionist painter of sunrises and seascapes. His painting, The Big Herd, won the Carnegie Prize in 1928. Following his death, his works appeared in the private collection of William Randolph Hearst, and he became the subject of Irving Stone's 1949 biographical work The Passionate Journey.

== Biography ==
Born to an upper-middle-class family that emigrated from England, Noble grew up on the prairie. He claimed to be the "first white child" born in Wichita, Kansas. As a young boy, he helped his father, also named John Noble, drive Texas Longhorn cattle along the Chisholm Trail and learned several Native American languages. He took his first painting lessons from Native American artists.

In the late 1890s, Noble worked as a photographer and artist in Wichita. He painted a saloon nude titled "Cleopatra at the Roman Bath" that came to be notoriously condemned and defaced by Carrie Nation, and a portrait of Albert Pike that still hangs in the reception room of the Wichita Consistory.

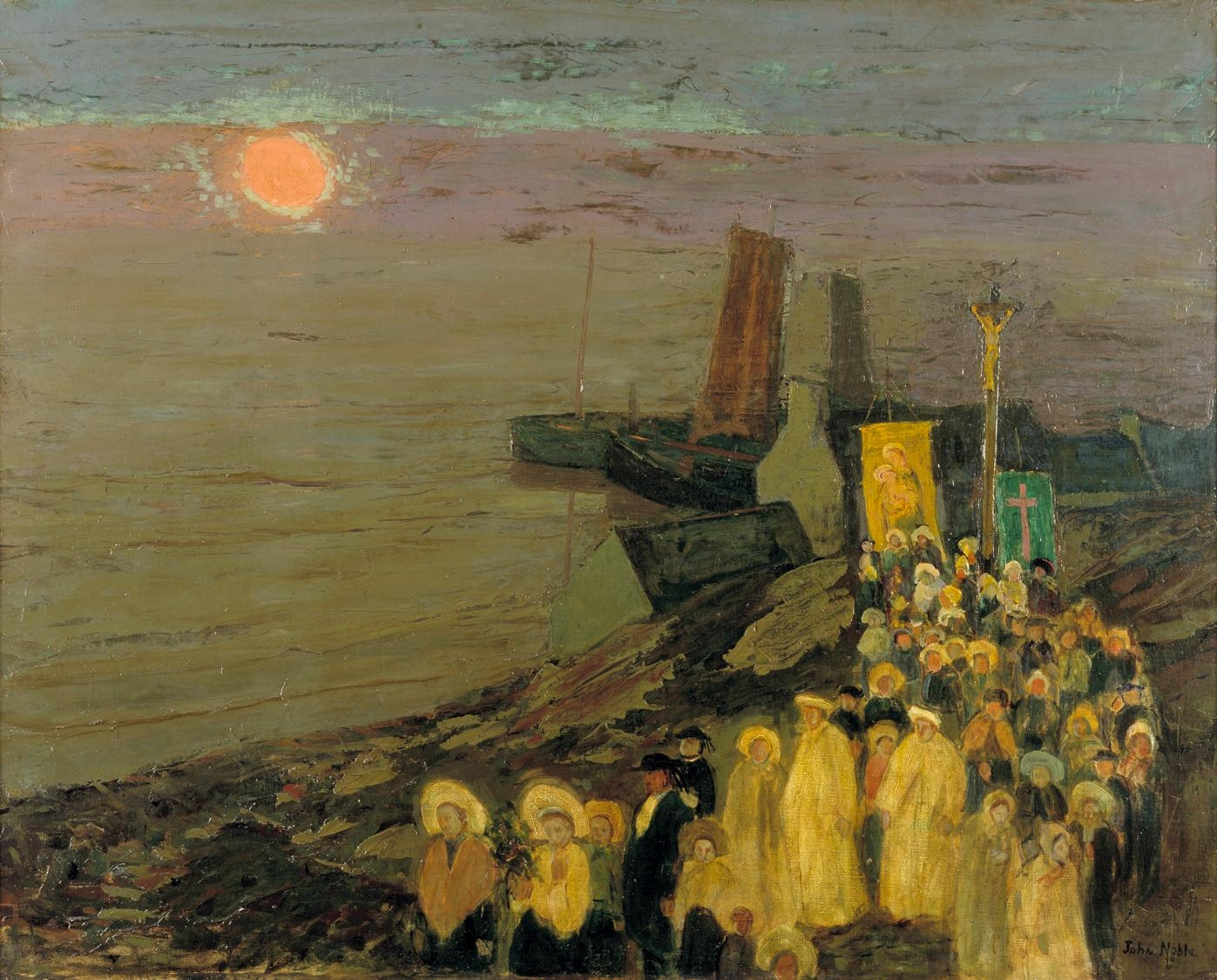
Blessing of the Sea (1911–13)

He went to France in 1903 at age 29. While abroad in France, he assumed the fictionalized frontier persona of "Wichita Bill". He wore snakeskin vests, Windsor ties, and five-gallon hats. He studied at the Académie Julian under Jean-Paul Laurens and befriended fellow American artists George Luks and Richard E. Miller. In 1909, he wed Amelia Peiche, formerly of Strasbourg, France.

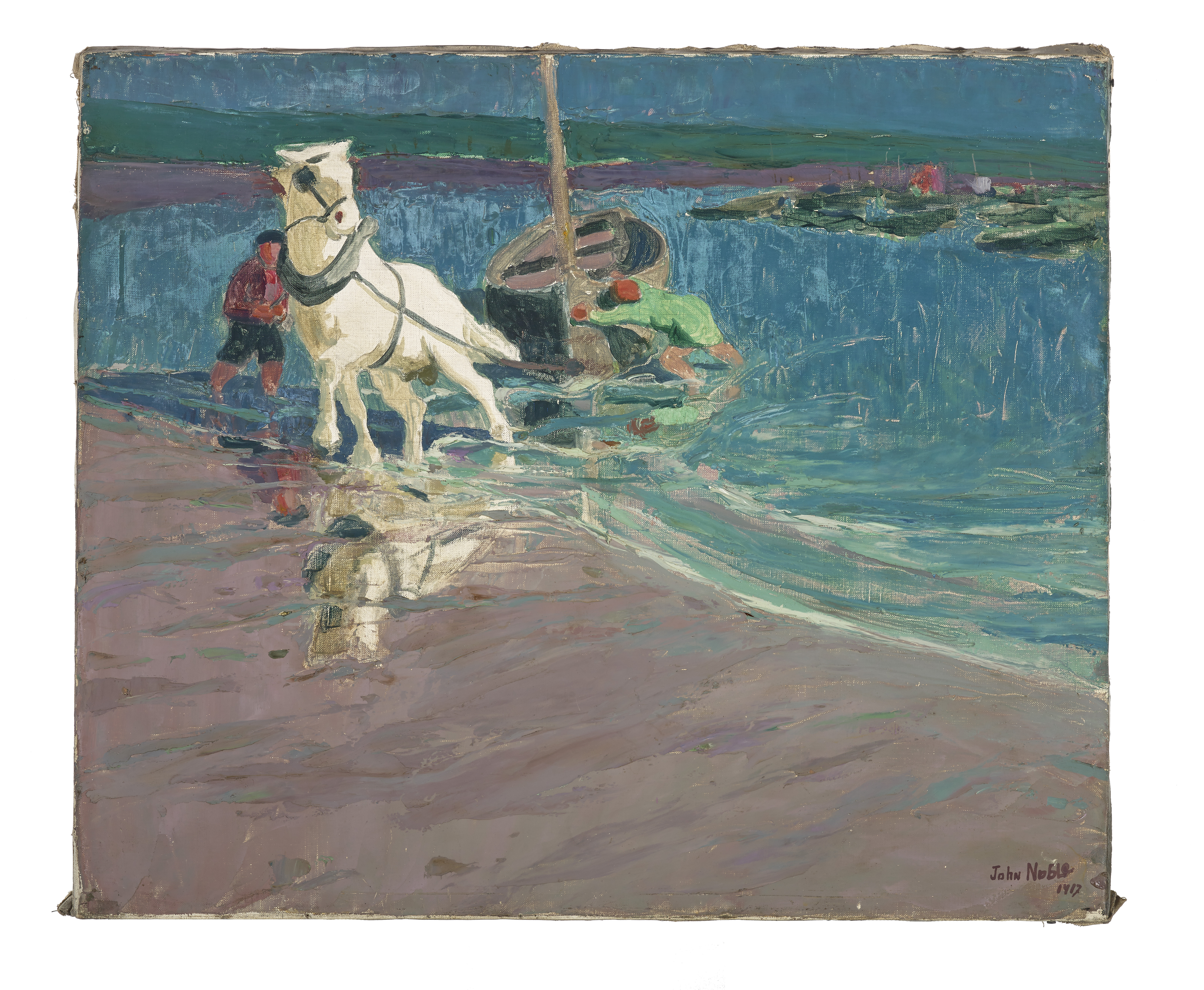
The White Horse (1917)

At the outbreak of World War I, Noble and his wife moved to England. He exhibited his work at the Daniel Gallery (1920), the Rehn Galleries (1922), and the Milch Galleries (1925). He often advised prospective customers not to purchase his works. He bought back pictures he sold in order to mutilate them.

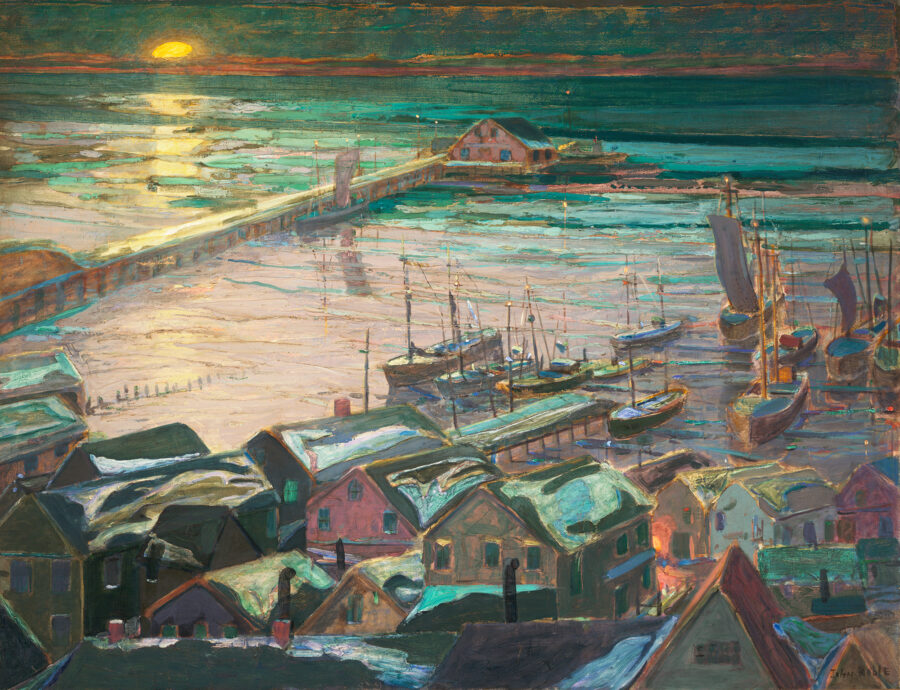
Provincetown in Winter (1920)

Returning from England, Noble briefly lived in Provincetown, Massachusetts. A chronic alcoholic, he died in New York City of paraldehyde poisoning on January 6, 1934.

He had two children, John and Towanda. His son, John A. Noble, was also a well-known artist and lithographer and is the namesake of the Noble Maritime Collection. In 1941, his widow found a landscape of a sunrise over Boulogne, France, that he had painted in the collection of press baron William Randolph Hearst. The landscape had been badly retouched, so she bought it, cut out and saved the sunrise from the center of the canvas that had not been retouched, and then took a carving knife and slashed the rest to ribbons.

== Legacy ==
In his 1940 autobiography Artist In Manhattan, Jerome Myers recalled his friendship with Noble:

The name of John Noble first became known to me through an early portrait which George Luks painted of him, called 'Whiskey Bill.' The thin, sensitive face was so unlike the Noble whom I knew many years later, when he returned from abroad. He came to see me, wearing his inevitable white sombrero and flowing Windsor tie; a powerfully built man with the serious face of a cleric under his hat, reminding me of Franz Liszt. Noble was a fine athlete. With George Luks, he played in the first professional baseball game in Paris. Alone, he rode his white horse into the cafes of Paris, a veritable rough rider, the idol of the French kids. Essentially, however, he was a religious mystic. The white horse went into his pictures as a poetic symbol. His religious processions of Brittany, as well as his boats off the Breton coast, were enveloped in a religious fog. In me John found something—I know not what—that appealed to him; perhaps it was something in my work that was attuned to his idea of art, making me an exception in his almost wholesale condemnation of his contemporaries. John's violent encounters at the Salmagundi Club are written large in the memory of that institution—outbursts which were impelled by a fanatic devotion to art. At their dinner, he yanked off the table cloth, carrying all the dishes with it―an indirect though forcible criticism of Salmagundi's art. Towards the end, a tragic brooding came over him. So great was the interior struggle between the John Noble who once fought off five policemen and the artist who painted Provincetown bathed in moonlight, that at last it wore away his resistance. Pathetically, desperately, he grasped at the grand illusion of art that was his life. He truly died for a cause—and that cause was the art of John Noble.

Irving Stone's 1949 work, The Passionate Journey is a biographical novel of John Noble's life.

Some of his paintings can be seen at the Wichita Art Museum.
