= John Noble (cricketer) =

English cricketer (1845–1889)

John Noble (4 August 1845 – 20 April 1889) was an English first-class cricketer active 1866–69 who played for Surrey. He was born in Kennington; died in Chelsea, London.
