= George Luks =

American cartoonist and painter (1867–1933)

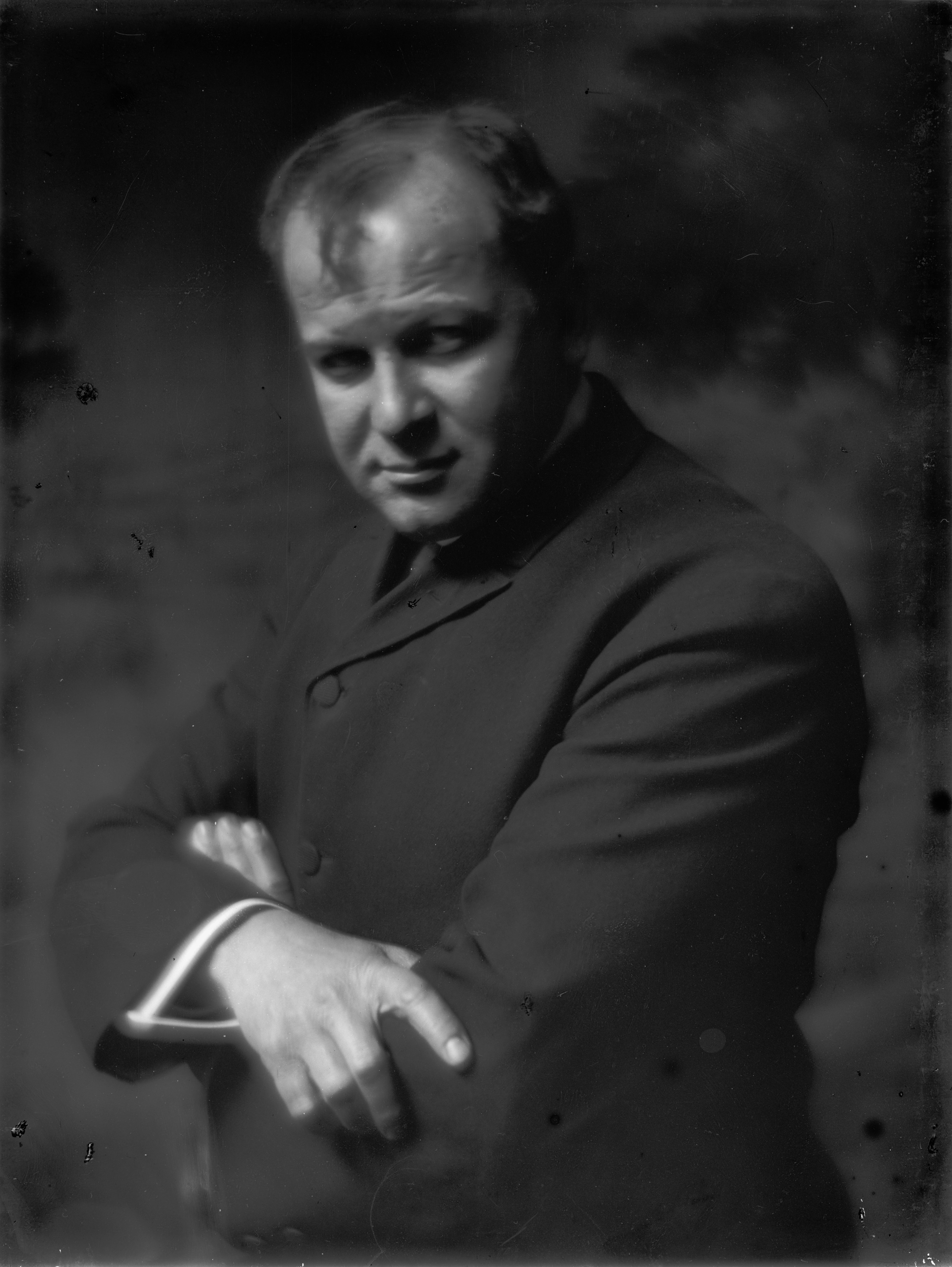
- Gertrude Käsebier, George Luks, c. 1910
- Born: August 13, 1867; Williamsport, Pennsylvania, U.S.
- Died: October 29, 1933 (aged 66); New York City, U.S.
- Education: Pennsylvania Academy
- Known for: Painting, comics
- Notable work: The Wrestlers
- Movement: Ashcan School

George Benjamin Luks (August 13, 1867 – October 29, 1933) was an American artist, identified with the aggressively realistic Ashcan School of American painting.

After travelling and studying in Europe, Luks worked as a newspaper illustrator and cartoonist in Philadelphia, where he became part of a close-knit group, led by Robert Henri, that set out to defy the genteel values imposed by the influential National Academy of Design. His best-known paintings reflect the life of the poor and hard-pressed on Manhattan’s Lower East Side.

== Early life and career ==
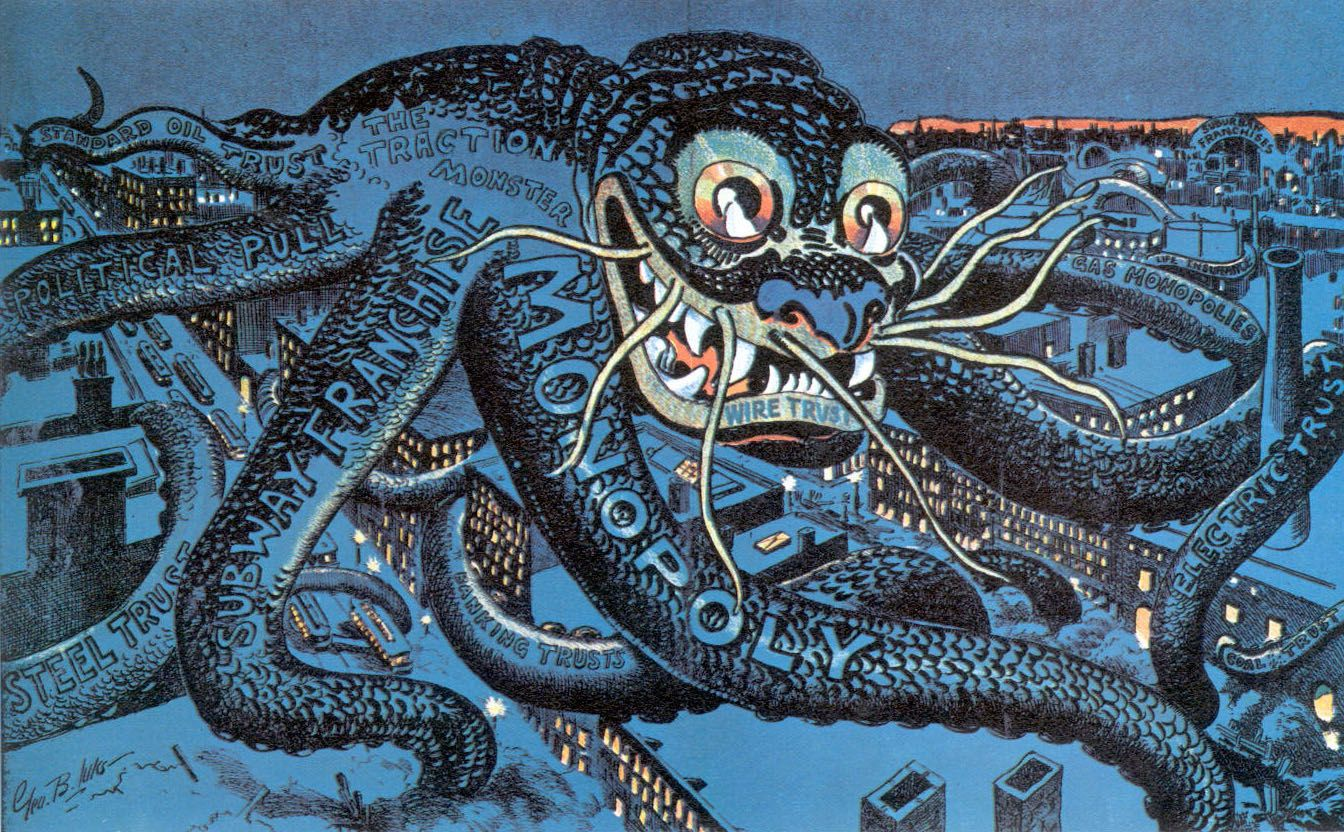
Luks' 1899 cartoon "The menace of the Hour" about "The Traction Monster" following the awarding of a no bid subway franchise contract by New York City's Tammany Hall

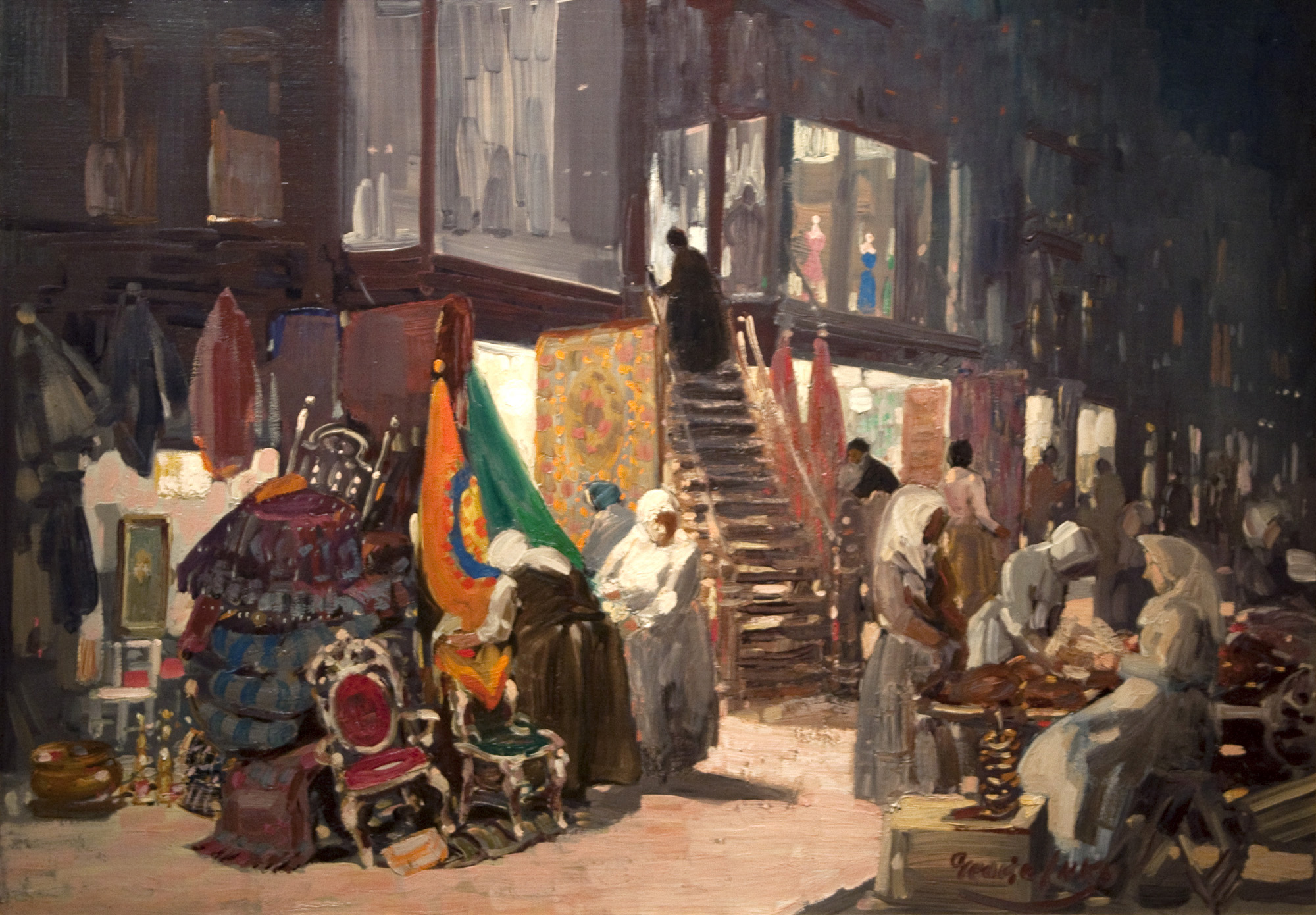
Allen Street, c. 1905, Hunter Museum of American Art

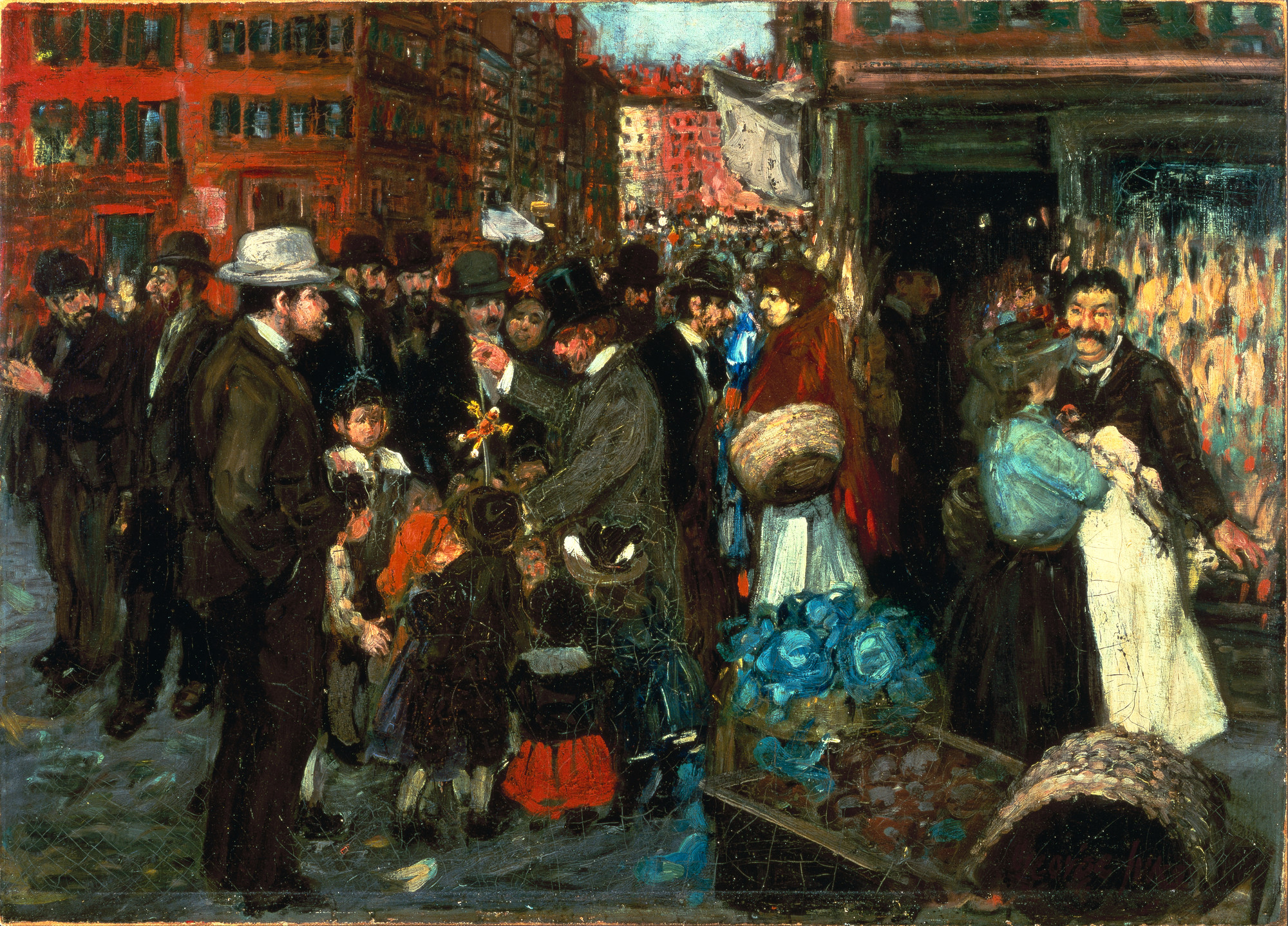
Street Scene (Hester Street), 1905, oil on canvas, Brooklyn Museum

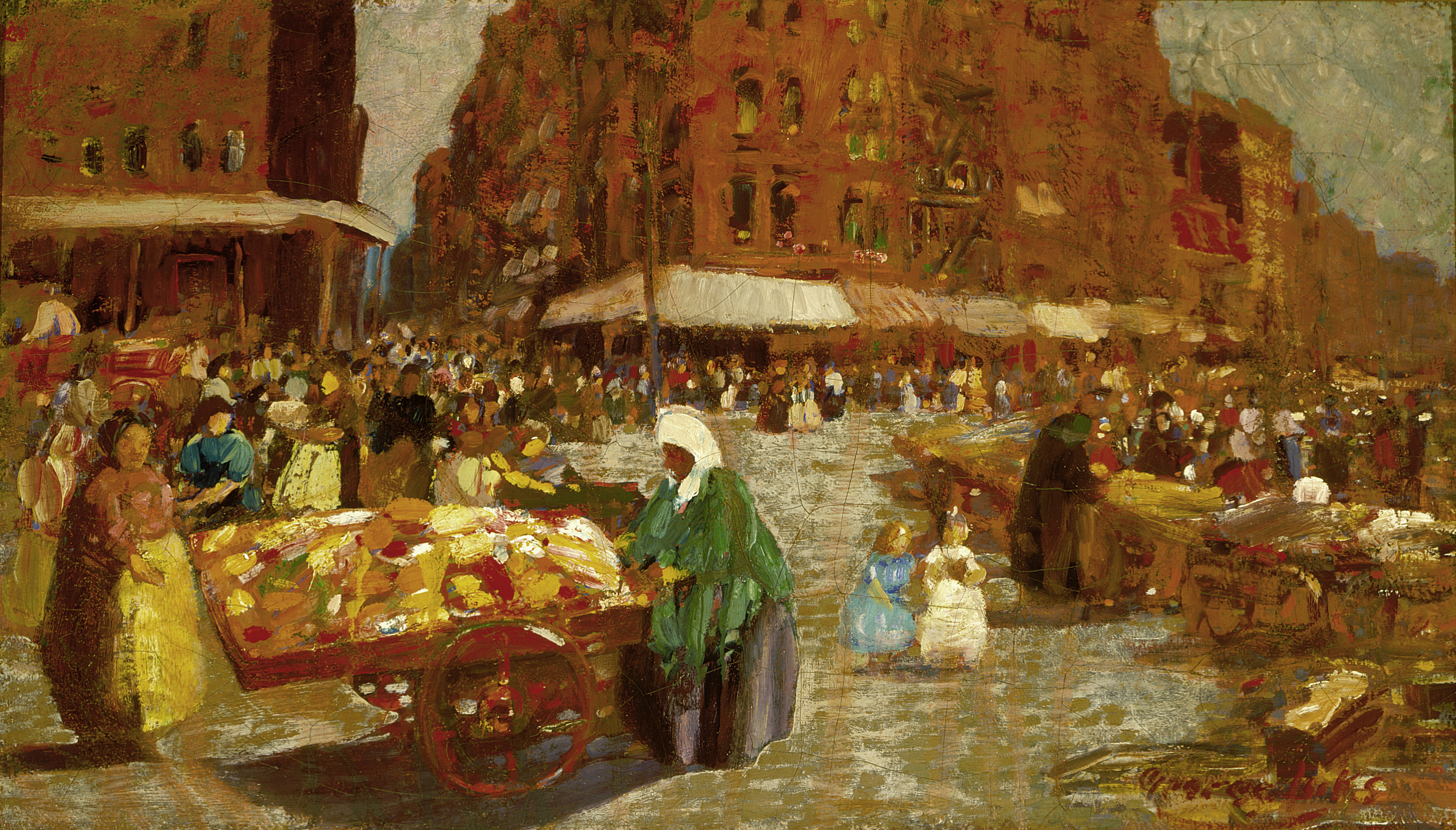
Houston Street, 1917, oil on canvas, Saint Louis Art Museum

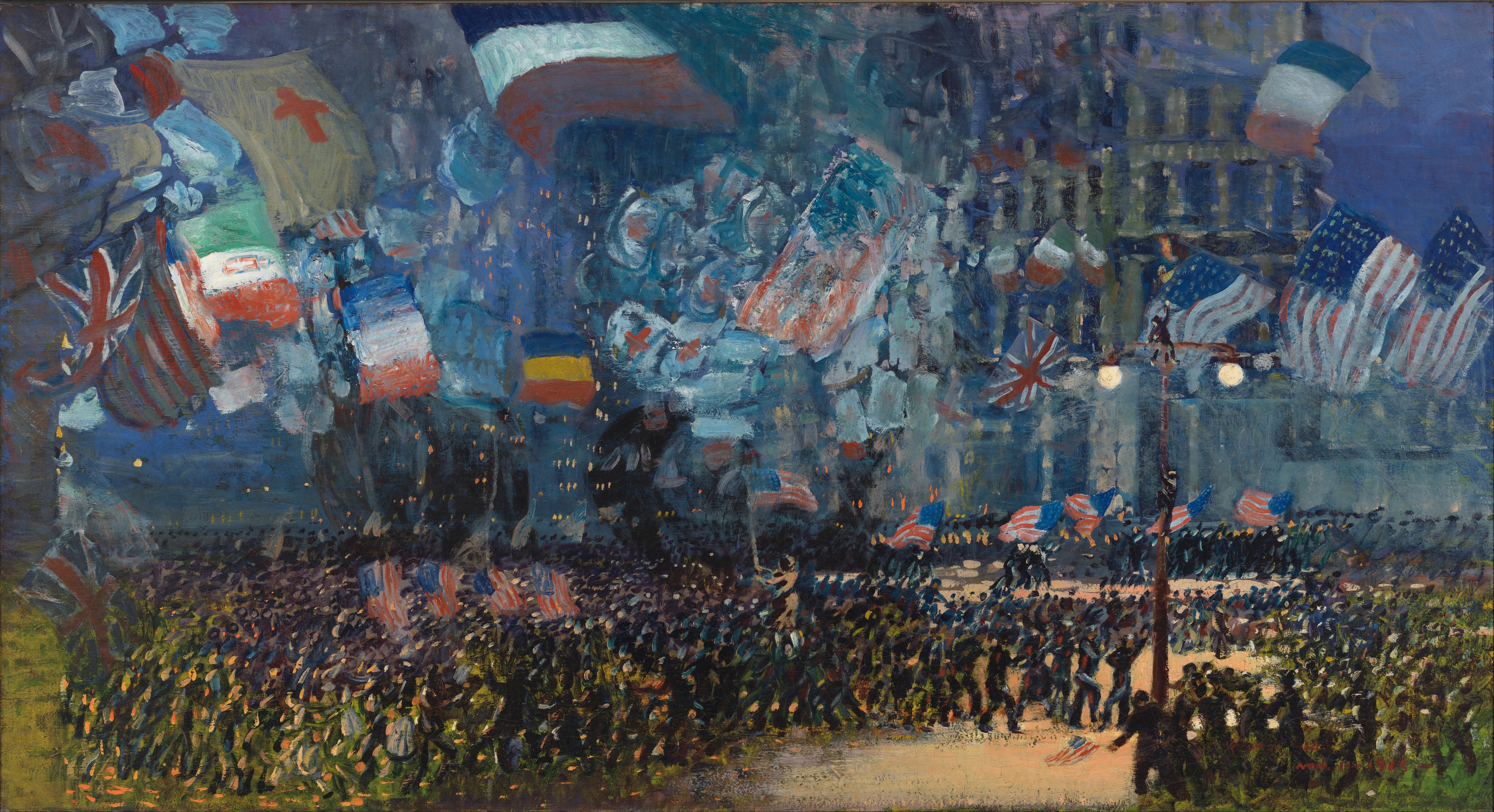
Armistice Night, 1918, oil on canvas

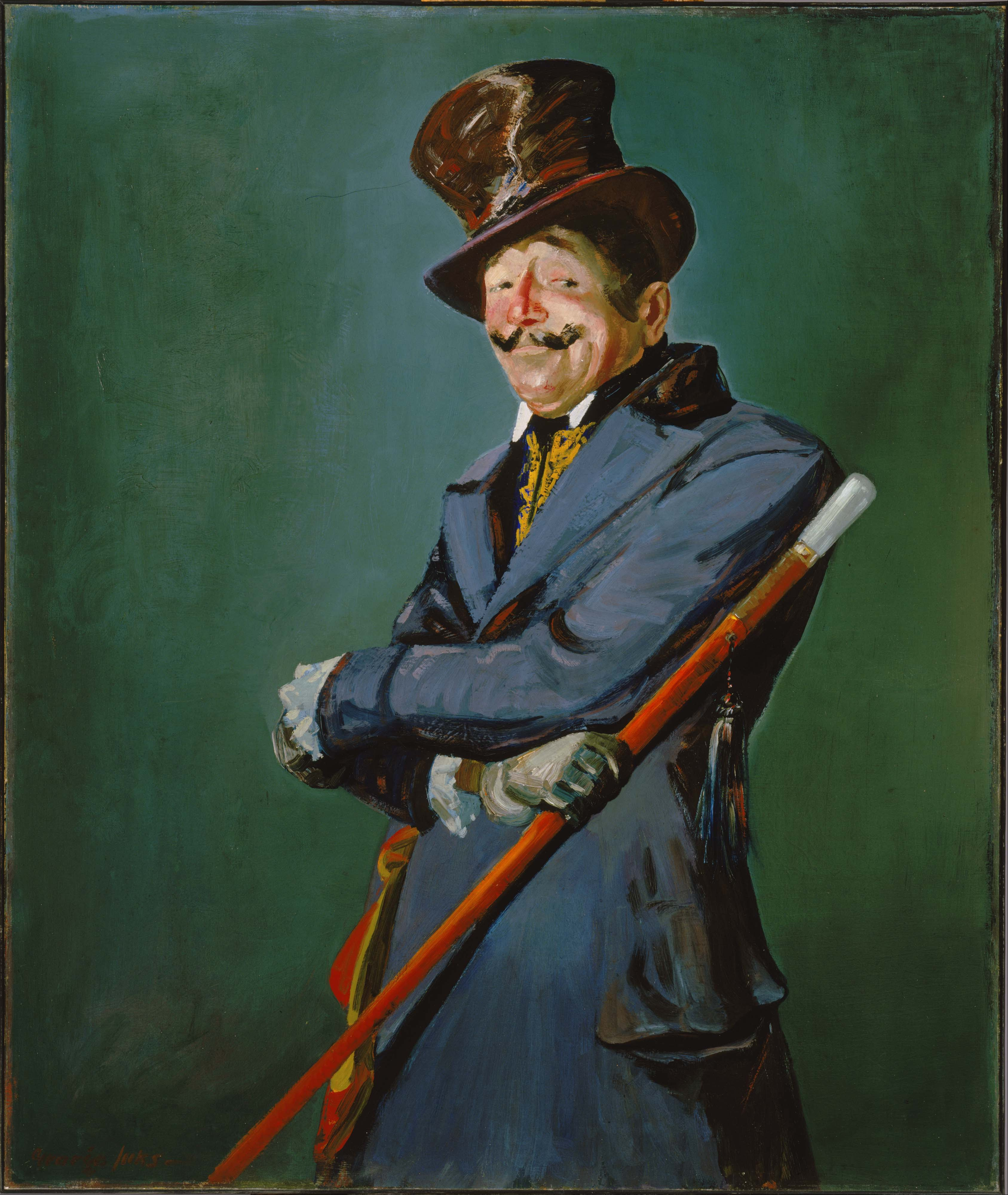
Otis Skinner as Col. Philippe Bridau, 1919

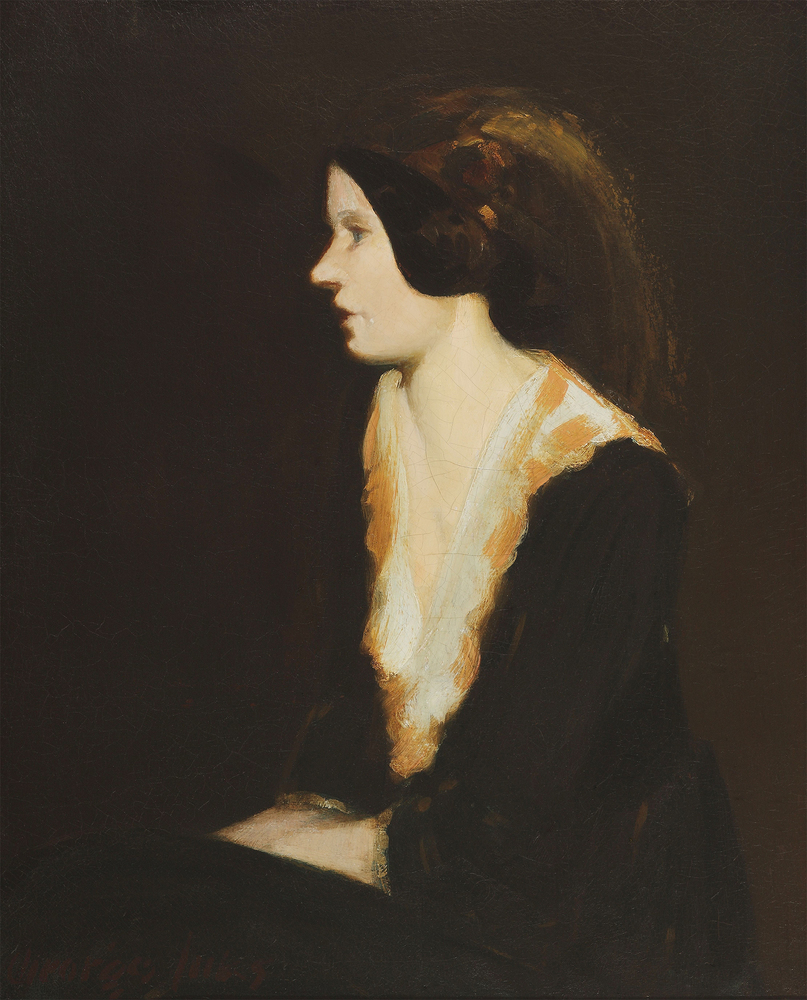
The White Blackbird, a 1919 portrait of Margarett Sargent

Madison Square, c. 1920

Luks was born in Williamsport, Pennsylvania, to Central European immigrants. According to the 1880 census, his father was born in Poland and his mother in Bavaria, Germany. His father was a physician and apothecary and his mother was an amateur painter and musician. The Luks family eventually moved to Pottsville, Pennsylvania, in east central Pennsylvania, near the coal fields. In this setting, he learned at a young age about poverty and compassion as he observed his parents helping the coal miners' families.

Luks began his working life in vaudeville. He and his younger brother played the Pennsylvania and New Jersey vaudeville circuit in the early 1880s while still in their teens.

He left performing when he decided to pursue a career as an artist. Luks knew from a young age that he wanted to be an artist and studied briefly at the Pennsylvania Academy of the Fine Arts before he traveled to Europe, where he attended several art schools and studied the Old Masters. He became an admirer of Spanish and Dutch painting, especially the work of Diego Velázquez and Frans Hals. Manet's energy and technique also appealed to Luks. Later he went to Düsseldorf, where he lived with a distant relative, allegedly a retired lion tamer, and took classes at the Düsseldorf School of Art. He eventually abandoned Düsseldorf for the more stimulating spheres of London and Paris.

== Cartoonist ==
In 1893, Luks returned to Philadelphia, where he eventually found work as an illustrator for the Philadelphia Press. As Robert L. Gambone writes, "Luks's experience as a Press artist-reporter proved seminal to his career, not so much for the work he accomplished as for the lifelong friends he acquired." (Note: Gambone's study of Luks's work as an illustrator indicates that his body of work in the field of magazine illustration was much more extensive than previously regarded, encompassing a 40-year period; he was drawing for Vanity Fair and The New Yorker in the 1920s.) Working at that newspaper, he met John Sloan, William Glackens, and Everett Shinn. These men would gather for weekly meetings, ribaldly social as well as intellectual, at the studio of Robert Henri, a painter several years their senior. Henri encouraged his younger friends to read Whitman, Emerson, Zola, and Ibsen as well as William Morris Hunt's Talks on Art and George Moore's Modern Painting. Chafing under the limitations of the Genteel Tradition, he wanted them to consider the need for a new style of painting that would speak more to their own time and experience. Henri was a persuasive advocate for the vigorous depiction of ordinary life; he believed American painters needed to shun genteel subjects and academic polish and to learn to paint more rapidly. In Luks, he had a ready listener but also a man who was never going to be comfortable in the role of acolyte.

In 1896, Luks moved to New York City and began work as an artist for Joseph Pulitzer's New York World, where one of his assignments was to draw the popular Hogan's Alley comic strip series (featuring the Yellow Kid). Luks began drawing the Yellow Kid after its creator, Richard F. Outcault, departed the World for William Randolph Hearst's New York Journal.

During his time as an illustrator there, he lived with William Glackens. Along with Everett Shinn and Robert Henri, Glackens encouraged Luks to spend more time on his serious painting. What ensued were several productive years in which Luks painted some of the most vigorous examples of what would be called "Ashcan art."

== "The Eight" ==
The rejection of many of their paintings, including works by Luks, from the exhibitions of the powerful, conservative National Academy of Design motivated Henri's followers to form their own short-lived independent exhibiting group. Consisting of Robert Henri, George Luks, William Glackens, John Sloan, Everett Shinn, Arthur B. Davies, Ernest Lawson, and Maurice Prendergast, the group exhibited as "The Eight" in January 1908. Their exhibition at the Macbeth Galleries in New York was a significant event in the promotion of twentieth-century American art. Although the styles of "The Eight" differed greatly (Davies, Lawson, and Prendergast were not urban realists), what unified the group was their advocacy of exhibition opportunities free from the jury system as well as their belief in content and painting techniques that were not necessarily sanctioned by the Academy. The traveling exhibition organized by John Sloan that followed the New York show brought the paintings to Chicago, Indianapolis, Toledo, Cincinnati, Pittsburgh, Bridgeport, and Newark and helped to promote a national debate about the new realism that the Ashcan school represented. Luks' Feeding the Pigs and Mammy Groody were seen as examples of this new earthiness many art lovers were not ready to accept.

== Ashcan School ==
Luks painted working-class subjects and scenes of urban life, the hallmarks of Ashcan realism, with great gusto. "Hester Street" (1905), in the collection of the Brooklyn Museum, captures Jewish immigrant life through Luks's vigorously painted representation of shoppers, pushcart peddlers, casual strollers, and curious onlookers of the ethnic variety that characterized turn-of-the century New York. Luks's work typifies the real-life scenes painted by the Ashcan School artists. Hester Street also demonstrates Luks' ability to effectively manipulate crowded compositions and to capture expressions and gestures as well as gritty background details. Allen Street (1905) and Houston Street (1917) are equally successful in this sense. The Lower East Side was a rich source of visual material for George Luks.

The Ashcan School successfully challenged academic art institutions, and the authority of the National Academy of Design as a cultural arbiter declined throughout the 1910s. At a time when the realist fiction of Theodore Dreiser and Frank Norris was gaining a wider audience and when muckraking journalists were calling attention to slum conditions in American cities, the Ashcan painters played a role in enlarging the nation's sense of what a suitable topic for artistic expression might be. The difference, though, between the realist writers and socially-minded journalists, on the one hand, and the painters, on the other hand, was that the Ashcan artists did not see their work primarily as social or political criticism.

The first known use of the "ash can" terminology in describing the movement was by Art Young, in 1916, but the term was applied later not only to the Henri circle, but also to such painters as George Bellows (another student of Henri), Jerome Myers, Gifford Beal, Glenn Coleman, Carl Sprinchorn, and Mabel Dwight and even to photographers Jacob Riis and Lewis Hine, who portrayed New York's working-class neighborhoods in a sometimes brutally realistic fashion.

In 1905, Luks painted two of his most famous works, icons of the Ashcan school: The Spielers, now in the collection of the Addison Gallery of American Art, and The Wrestlers, now in the collection of the Museum of Fine Arts in Boston.

These two paintings also illustrate radically different aspects of Luks' temperament. In The Spielers, two young girls dance frenetically, their joyous faces forming an appealing contrast to their grimy hands.

Luks portrays the ability of working-class children to experience pleasure despite their circumstances. Sentimental or otherwise, he painted the truth, as he saw it, as his friend Everett Shinn wrote. The Wrestlers, on the other hand, is a testament to masculine bravado, a massive, sumptuously painted canvas in which one beefy man has been pinned to the mat by another; the face of the defeated wrestler, turned upside down, stares straight at us. The pose is contorted, every muscle bulges, and the paint reflects the sweat and strain of the match.

Luks was respected as a master of strong color effects. When interviewed on the topic, he said, "I'll tell you the whole secret! Color is simply light and shade. You don't need pink or grey or blue so long as you have volume. Pink and blue change with light or time. Volume endures."

Although Luks is most well known for his depictions of New York City life, he also painted landscapes and portraits and was an accomplished watercolorist. His visual perception was acute, no matter the genre, the art critic Sadakichi Hartmann noted. In later years, he painted society portraits (e.g., Society Girl). His style was not uniform throughout his career, though. The Cafe Francis (1906) contains more impressionist touches than his usual dark scenes of lower-class urban life, and his interest in documentary accuracy varied. Sulky Boy (1908), for example, depicts the son of a doctor at Bellevue Hospital who treated Luks for alcoholism, but it has been noted that Luks was more concerned with depicting the boy's demeanor than conveying an authentic representation of the surroundings.

Like Henri and Sloan, Luks was also a teacher, first at the Arts Students League on West 57th Street in Manhattan and, later, across the street at a school he established himself, which remained open until the time of his death. One student, the painter Elsie Driggs, remembered him as a charismatic force in the classroom. He enjoyed the adulation of his pupils and was a great raconteur. He was not interested in preaching the tenets of modernism; his commitment was to realism and direct observation.

His work was also part of the painting event in the art competition at the 1932 Summer Olympics.

== Personality ==
Luks was a born rebel and one of the most distinctive personalities in American art. "He is Puck. He is Caliban. He is Falstaff," his contemporary, the art critic James Gibbons Huneker, wrote. Like many of the later Abstract Expressionist men, he made a great display of his masculinity and could seldom retreat from a dare. He took pride in being known as the "bad boy" of American art, liked to characterize himself as entirely self-created, and downplayed the influence of Robert Henri, or any contemporary, on his artistic development. He was given to hyperbolic statements and was often intentionally vague about autobiographical details, preferring to maintain an aura of self-mythologizing mystery. He was equally at home at a prize fight or in a tavern as in a museum or a gallery. Luks was always a heavy drinker, and his friend and one-time roommate William Glackens often had to undress him and haul him to bed after a night of drunken debauchery. Although many sources confirm this tendency, they also characterize him as a man with a kind heart who befriended people living on the edge who became subjects for his works of art. Examples of this are numerous: e.g., Widow McGee (1902) or The Old Duchess and The Rag Picker (both of 1905), in which Luks depicted with sensitivity elderly, down-and-out women who knew the harsh realities of the street. Luks was a paradox: a man of enormous egotism and a great generosity of spirit.

== Personal life and death ==
Luks was married twice but had no children.

Luks was found dead in a doorway by a policeman in the early morning hours of October 29, 1933. Ira Glackens, the son of William Glackens, wrote about Luks's death that, contrary to the newspaper account stating that the painter had succumbed on his way to paint the dawn sky, he had actually been beaten to death in an altercation with a customer at a nearby bar.

His packed funeral was attended by family, former students, and past and present friends. He was buried in an 18th-century embroidered waistcoat, one of his most valued possessions. He is buried at Fernwood Cemetery in Royersford, Pennsylvania.

== Selected exhibitions ==
- 1904: National Arts Club (Luks, Glackens, Henri, Sloan, Davies, Prendergast)
- 1908: The Macbeth Galleries exhibition of The Eight
- 1913: The Armory Show (six Luks paintings were included)
- 1937: New York Realists, the Whitney Museum of American Art
- 1943: The Eight, Brooklyn Museum of Art
- 1992: Painters of a New Century: The Eight and American Art, Brooklyn Museum
- 1994: George Luks: The Watercolors Rediscovered, Canton Museum of Art
- 1995: Metropolitan Lives: The Ashcan Artists and Their New York, National Museum of American Art
- 1997: Owen Gallery, New York, 1997
- 2000: City Life Around the Eight, The Metropolitan Museum of Art
- 2007: Life's Pleasures: The Ashcan Artists' Brush with Leisure, 1895–1925, The New York Historical Society
- 2009: The Eight and American Modernisms, Milwaukee Art Museum

== Selected list of artworks ==
- The Butcher Cart (1901), Chicago Art Institute
- The Little Milliner (1905), Toledo Museum of Art
- The Spielers (1905), Addison Gallery of American Art
- The Wrestlers (1905), Museum of Fine Arts, Boston
- The Rag Picker (1905), private collection
- The Old Duchess (1905), Metropolitan Museum of Art
- Hester Street (1905), Brooklyn Museum of Art
- The Cafe Francis (1906), Butler Institute of American Art
- Woman with Macaws (1907), Detroit Institute of Arts
- Portrait of a Young Lady, (1908), private collection
- Sulky Boy (1908), Phillips Collection
- The Guitar (Portrait of the Artist’s Brother with his Son) (1908), Westmoreland Museum of American Art
- The New York River, New York (1910), private collection
- Nursemaids, High Bridge Park, private collection
- Boy with Baseball (1925), Metropolitan Museum of Art

== Students ==
His students included Norman Raeben, Elsie Driggs, and John Alan Maxwell. Luks also taught painting to Celeste Woss y Gil at the Arts Students League.

== Sources ==
- Brown, Milton. American Painting from the Armory Show to the Depression. Princeton: Princeton University Press, 1955.
- Gambone, Robert L. Life on the Press: The Popular Art and Illustrations of George Benjamin Luks. Jackson, MS: University Press of Mississippi, 2009.
- Glackens, Ira. William Glackens and the Ash Can School: The Emergence of Realism in American Art. New York: Crown, 1957.
- Hughes, Robert. American Visions: The Epic History of Art in America. New York: Knopf, 1997.
- Huneker, James Gibbons. Bedouins. New York: Scribners, 1920.
- Hunter, Sam. Modern American Painting and Sculpture. New York: Dell, 1959.
- Kennedy, Elizabeth (ed.) The Eight and American Modernisms. Chicago: University of Chicago Press, 2009.
- Loughery, John. "The Mysterious George Luks." Arts Magazine (December 1987), pp. 34–35.
- O'Toole, Judith Hansen. "George Luks: An Artistic Legacy." New York City: Owen Gallery (unpaginated catalogue), 1997.
- O'Toole, Judith Hansen. "George Luks: Rogue, Raconteur, and Realist" (pp. 91–108) in Elizabeth Kennedy (ed.). The Eight and American Modernisms. Chicago: University of Chicago Press, 2009.
- O'Toole, Judith Hansen. "George Luks: The Watercolors Rediscovered." Canton, OH: Canton Museum of Art (exhibition catalogue), 1994.
- Perlman, Bennard B. Painters of the Ashcan School: The Immortal Eight. New York: Dover, 1979.
