= John A. Noble =

American painter (1913–1983)

- Born: 1913; Paris, France
- Died: May 1983 (aged 69–70); St. George, Staten Island
- Education: University of Grenoble, National Academy of Design
- Known for: Marine art
- Spouse: Susan Ames
- Website: www.noblemaritime.org

John Alexander Noble (1913–1983) was an artist known for creating drawings, paintings, and lithographs of ships and harbors around New York City.

== Early life ==
Noble was born in Paris, France, in 1913. The son of painter American John Noble, he moved to the United States with his family in 1919. About 1929, he started drawing and painting. While in school he was a "permanent fixture" on the McCarren line tugs, which towed schooners in New York Harbor. In the summer, he would go to sea. In 1931, he graduated from Friends Seminary and returned to France, where he studied for a year at the University of Grenoble and met his wife, Susan Ames. When he returned to New York, he studied for a year at the National Academy of Design.

== Career ==
From 1928 to 1945, Noble worked as a seaman on schooners and in marine salvage in New York Harbor. When he saw the Port Johnston Coal Docks on the Kill van Kull, which had become a "great boneyard" of wooden sailing vessels, the sight of it "affected him for life". In 1941, he began to build a floating, "houseboat" studio there, made out of salvaged ship parts. From 1946, he worked as an artist full-time, voyaging through New York Harbor in a rowboat and creating—in oil paintings, charcoal drawings, sketches and lithographs—a "unique and exacting record" of the "characters, industries, and vessels" of the harbor.

== Death ==
Noble died in May 1983. His wife had died earlier that year. At a memorial service at the Snug Harbor Cultural Center three weeks later, 200 people, including Staten Island borough president Anthony Gaeta and Noble's two sons, spoke in remembrance. A fire boat shot plumes of water and tugboats sounded their horns.

== Legacy ==
The Noble Maritime Collection was established in 1987 to preserve and interpret Noble's work.

The Staten Island Ferry John A. Noble is named for him.
