= John Noble (publisher) =

John Noble (died 1797) was a bookseller and publisher in London in the 18th century. He issued works by Daniel Defoe, George Smith Green, Eliza Haywood, Jane Marshall, John Robinson, and others. As part of his enterprise he ran a circulating library near Leicester Square that stocked some 5,535 titles by the 1760s. By the late 1770s his business had been taken over by B. Desbrow. John's brother Francis Noble (d.1792) also worked in the book trade.

Contemporary reviews of Noble's publications were mixed. A novel entitled False Gratitude (1773) was judged "extremely bad;" Affected Indifference (1771) was "not void of interesting scenes ... tolerable entertainment to even a cultivated mind."
