= List of New Deal sculpture =

US government funded artwork, 1933–1942

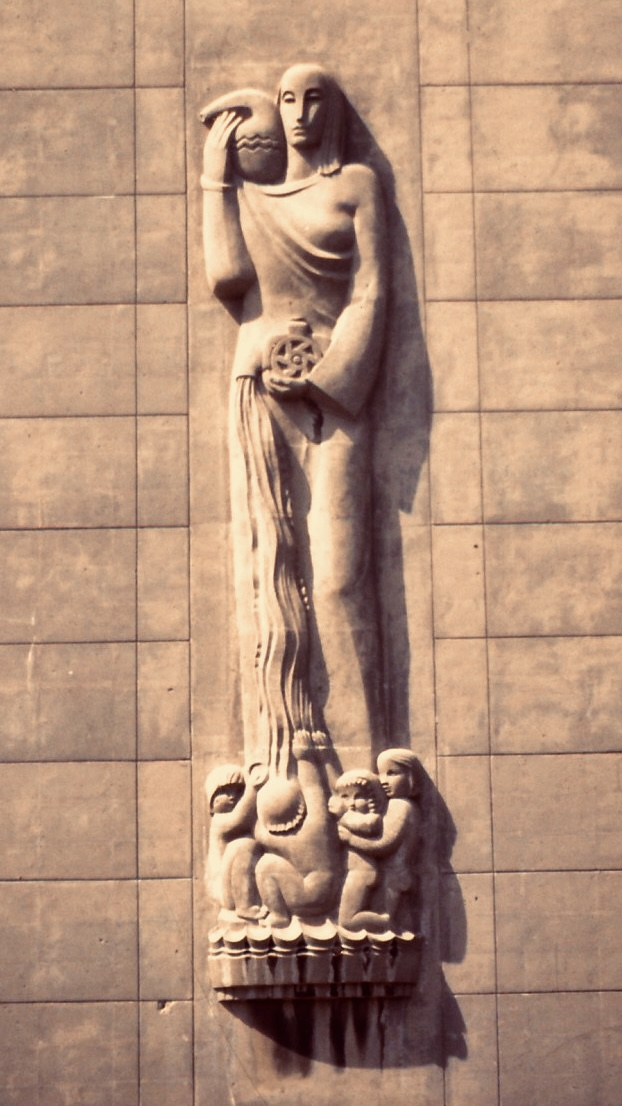
Aquarius (1938), by Samuel Cashwan, for the John F. Dye Water Conditioning Plant in Lansing, Michigan

During the New Deal era, the United States federal government funded relief, architectural, and freestanding sculpture throughout the country and its territories.

This New Deal artwork included works produced under the Public Works of Art Project (1933–1934), Treasury Relief Art Project (1935–1938), Federal Art Projects (1935–1943), the Treasury Section of Painting and Sculpture (1934–1943), and other federally sponsored projects.

Unless otherwise noted, sources are from Park and Markowitz or American Art Annual, 1941. "USPO" refers to a United States Post Office building.

== Alabama ==
Location	Title	Image	Artist	Medium	Date	Notes
Alexander City Post Office, Alexander City	Tobacco, Wheat, and Cotton		Franc Epping	terra cotta	1941	Reliefs stored in the modern Alexander City City Hall; original post office building became a community center, then microbrewery.
Opp City Hall (formerly Opp Post Office), Opp Commercial Historic District, Opp	Opp		Hans Mangelsdorf	wood	1940	Relief missing, last known to be in the possession of the Opp Historical Society in the 1990s.
Scottsboro Post Office, Scottsboro	Alabama Agriculture		Constance Ortmayer	plaster	1940	Three-panel relief

== Arizona ==
Location	Title	Image	Artist	Medium	Date	Notes
Cochise County Court House, Bisbee	The Arizona Miner		Phillips Sanderson	painted cast stone	1935	nine-foot-tall statue in front of building
USPO Flagstaff	Arizona logging		Robert Kittredge	plaster	1940	relief, since moved, missing
Arizona State Fairgrounds Grandstand, Phoenix	history and Arizona activities		David Carrick Swing and Florence Blakeslee	copper sprayed cast concrete	1936	23 panels
USPO & Forestry Building, Springerville	Apache Chiefs Geronimo and Vittorio		Robert Kittredge	plaster	1939	relief
Arizona State University campus, Tempe	fountain		Emry Kopta	cast concrete	1934	only the bottom of three tiers was completed
Hayden Library, Arizona State University, Tempe	The Flute Player		Emry Kopta	bronze	1934	originally intended as top of fountain

== Arkansas ==
Location	Title	Image	Artist	Medium	Date	Notes
Berryville Post Office	Man and Woman, Arkansas		Daniel Gillette Olney		1940	
Monticello Post Office	Tomato Culture		Berta Margoulies	terra cotta	1941	3 reliefs

== California ==
Location	Title	Image	Artist	Medium	Date	Notes
USPO Bell	Eagle		Stuart Holmes	wood	1937	"in private hands"
United States Post Office (Berkeley, California)	Pony Express-Early California		David Slivka	limestone	1937	relief
USPO Burlingame	The Letter		James L. Hansen	cast stone	1941	
USPO Claremont	Eagle		Stuart Holmes		1936	missing
USPO Colton	Eagle		Sherry Peticolas and Gordon Newell		1936	
USPO Covina	Covina Desert Orange Groves		Atanas Katchamakoff	Spanish cedar	1941	relief
Urho Saari Swim Stadium, El Segundo	Swimmers		Merrill Gage		1941	Untitled reliefs of figures in swimwear flanking the main entrance
Fresno Unified School District Education Center, originally U.S. Post Office and Courthouse, Fresno	RFD 1 and RFD 2		Helen Bell Bruton	terra cotta	1940	reliefs
Fresno Unified School District Education Center, originally U.S. Post Office and Courthouse, Fresno	American Eagles		William Calfee	cast concrete	1940	
Fresno Unified School District Education Center, originally U.S. Post Office and Courthouse, Fresno	Justice		Archibald Garner	cast concrete	1940	relief
USPO Gardena	Rural Life		Rudolph Parducci	1941	carved mahogany	relief; see also exterior detail: prop plane, train, ship
Glendale Community College, Glendale	Fountain with mosaic		Archibald Garner			
USPO Hollister	Early California		Vladimir Menkoff; Joseph Stone and Avis Zeigler, assistants	wood	1936	
USPO Inglewood	Centinela Springs		Archibald Garner	mahogany	1937	relief
Inglewood	Buffalo, Bear, Cougar, Bighorn Sheep		Sherry Peticolas and Gordon Newell	plaster	1937	
King City High School, King City	King City High School Auditorium		Jo Mora	Concrete	1939	listed on the National Register of Historic Places in Monterey County, California
USPO Livermore	The Ranch Post Box		Robert Boardman Howard	oak	1941	relief
Griffith Observatory, Los Angeles	Astronomers Monument		Roger Noble Burnham, Djey El Djey, Arnold Foerster, Archibald Garner, Gordon Newell, and George Stanley	concrete	1934	
United States Post Office (Hollywood, Los Angeles)	Horsemen		Sherry Peticolas and Gordon Newell	wood	1937	
Lafayette Park, Los Angeles	Power of Water		Henry Lion, Jason Herron, and Sherry Peticolas; engineer Paul Jeffers		1934	Fountain with bas relief frieze commissioned by the PWAP
Cabrillo Beach, San Pedro, Los Angeles	Juan Rodriguez Cabrillo		Henry Lion	cast concrete	1936	Statue of Juan Rodríguez Cabrillo commissioned by the Federal Art Project.
Spring Street Courthouse, originally U.S. Post Office and Courthouse, Los Angeles	Eagles		James Hansen		1941	
Spring Street Courthouse, originally U.S. Post Office and Courthouse, Los Angeles	Eagles		Henry Lion	cast stone	1938	Two eagles on the facade
Spring Street Courthouse, originally U.S. Post Office and Courthouse, Los Angeles	Law		Archibald Garner	limestone	1941	"in storage" (1984)
Spring Street Courthouse, originally U.S. Post Office and Courthouse, Los Angeles	Young Lincoln		James L. Hansen	limestone	1941	"now Recorder of Deeds"
USPO Oceanside	Eagle		Stuart Holmes		1936	carved grill
Newman Park, Riverside	Juan Bautista De Anza		Sherry Peticolas	carved granite	1939	statue
Newman Park, Riverside	Departure from Tubac Second De Anza Expedition, 1775		Dorr Bothwell	sandstone	1939	bas relief
USPO Roseville	The Letter		Zygmund Sazevich	wood	1937	relief
USPO Salinas	Cowboy, Cattleman, and Cowboy and Horse		Richard O'Hanlon	walnut	1937	reliefs
USPO San Fernando	Transportation of the Mail		Sherry Peticolas and Gordon Newell	Wood	1936	Truck, horse, ship, train, stagecoach
USPO San Diego	Transportation of the Mail		Archibald Garner		1937	
San Francisco Mint	Minting Process and Eagle		Albert Stewart	bronze	1937	4 reliefs
St. Matthew Station, formerly San Mateo Main Post Office, San Mateo	Indian Maidens		Zygmund Sazevich	wood	1935	relief
United States Post Office-Santa Barbara Main	Transportation of the Mail		William Atkinson	plaster	1937	6 sunken reliefs
USPO Santa Clara	Early Pioneers		Michael von Meyer	wood	1937	
Santa Monica	Santa Monica		Eugene Morahan	Concrete	1934	Statue commissioned by the Public Works of Art Project (PWAP)
USPO Yuba City	The Wealth of Sutter County		Lulu H. Brighetta	wood	1942	relief

== Colorado ==
Location	Title	Image	Artist	Medium	Date	Notes
Delta Post Office, Delta	Cattle and Fruit		Mary Kittredge	plaster	1942	bas reliefs
Byron White United States Courthouse, Denver	Rocky Mountain Sheep and White Ram	Denver Courthouse ram	Gladys Caldwell Fisher	limestone	1936	
Las Animas Post Office, Las Animas	Kiowa Travois		Gladys Caldwell Fisher	wood	1939	relief
USPO Longmont	Transcontinental Mail or Ways of the Mail		Arnold Ronnebeck	terra cotta	1937	3 reliefs, missing

== Connecticut ==
Location	Title	Image	Artist	Medium	Date	Notes
USPO New Milford	The Post		Mildred Jerome	wood	1938	reliefs, building now (1984 school board offices
USPO Oakville	The Picnickers		Theodore Barbarossa	wood	1941	relief
Norwalk Main Post Office, South Norwalk, Norwalk	Eagle		Gaetano Cecere	marble	1941	relief
Fairgate housing complex, Stamford	Mother and Son		Henry Kreis	Pink granite	1938	Originally sculpted for Fairfield Court (now Fairgate) public housing
Czescik Marina Park, Stamford	Neighbors		Henry Kreis	Pink granite	1938	Originally sculpted for Fairfield Court (now Fairgate) public housing
USPO Windsor	Stringing, Transplanting, and Harvesting		Nena de Brennecke	wood	1943	

== District of Columbia ==
Location	Title	Image	Artist	Medium	Date	Notes
Department of Commerce Building			James Earle Fraser and Laura Gardin Fraser created 1/2" to 1' plaster sketches of all the pediments fabricated by various sculptors			Several of the sculptural elements on the building by Ricci & Zari and carved by Edward Ardolino were executed before the New Deal so don't fit into the parameters of this article. The later sculpture finished in 1934 does fall into the New Deal era.
Department of Commerce Building	Foreign and Domestic commerce		Ulysses Ricci	limestone	1934	designed by James Earle Fraser
Department of Commerce Building	Fisheries		Joseph Kiselewski	limestone	1934	designed by James Earle Fraser, carved by the Gino Ratti Company
Department of Commerce Building	Aeronautics		Haig Patigian	limestone	1934	designed by James Earle Fraser, carved by Geno A. Ratti Company
Department of Commerce Building	Mining		Frederick G.R. Roth		1943	designed by James Earle Fraser, carved by the Gino Ratti Company
Federal Trade Commission Building	Construction		Chaim Gross	limestone	1938	
Federal Trade Commission Building	Shipping		Robert Laurent	limestone	1938	
Federal Trade Commission Building	Aluminum grills		William McVey	Aluminum	1938	
Federal Trade Commission Building	Agriculture		Concetta Scaravaglione	limestone	1938	
Federal Trade Commission Building	Foreign Trade		Carl Schmitz	limestone	1938	
Federal Trade Commission Building	American Eagles		Sidney Waugh	limestone	1938	
Federal Trade Commission Building, Constitution Avenue side	Man Controlling Trade		Michael Lantz	limestone	1942	
Federal Trade Commission Building, Pennsylvania Avenue side	Man Controlling Trade		Michael Lantz	limestone	1942	
Government Printing Office Warehouse Building	Men Stacking Paper Stock, Printing Press Activities		Elliott Means		1937	
Government Printing Office Warehouse Building	Government Printing Office Seal		Armin Scheler		1937	
former Home Owners' Loan Corporation Building	7 reliefs, "The Building Trades"		Albert Stewart	limestone	1936	
Internal Revenue Service Building	four identical eagles with fasces		Ricci & Zari	limestone	1936	
Langston Terrace Dwellings	Emancipation of the Colored Man aka The Progress of the Negro Race		Daniel Olney	terra cotta	1937	
National Zoological Park	Pre-historic Animals		Charles R. Wright		1937	
National Zoological Park	Anteater, Entrance to the Mammal House		Erwin Springweiler		1937	
National Zoological Park	Tumbling Bears		Heinz Warneke		1938	
Post Office Department Building	Post Rider Continental 1775 to 1789		Alexander Stirling Calder	aluminum	1936	
Post Office Department Building	Rural Free Delivery		Gaetano Cecere		1936	
Post Office Department Building	Portraits of 8 former Postmasters General		Gleb Derujinsky		1937	
Post Office Department Building	Alaska Snowshoe Carrier		Chaim Gross	aluminum	1936	
Post Office Department Building	Pony Express 1850–1858		Arthur Lee		1937	
Post Office Department Building	Air Mail		Oronzio Maldarelli		1936	
Post Office Department Building	Samuel Osgood, First Postmaster General		Paul Manship		1937	
Post Office Department Building	Postman 1961-1775		Berta Margoulies		1936	
Post Office Department Building	Present Day Postman		Attilio Piccirilli		1937	
Post Office Department Building	Railway Mail-1862		Concetta Scaravaglione		1936	
Post Office Department Building	City Delivery Carrier		Carl Schmitz		1936	
Post Office Department Building	Tropical Postman		Louis Slobodkin		1936	
Post Office Department Building	Express Man		Heinz Warneke		1936	
Post Office Department Building	Stage driver, 1789–1836		Sidney Waugh		1936	
Post Office Department Building	Benjamin Franklin, the First Colonial Postmaster		William Zorach		1937	
Social Security & RR Retirement Board Building	American Eagle		Richmond Barthé		1940	
Social Security & RR Retirement Board Building	Family group, Unemployment Compensation		Emma Lu Davis		1941	
Social Security & RR Retirement Board Building	Railroad Employment, Railroad Retirement		Robert Kittredge		1941	
Social Security & RR Retirement Board Building	The Growth of Social Security, The Benefits of Social Security		Henry Kreis		1941	
Social Security & RR Retirement Board Building	Two eagles		Heinz Warneke		1941	
U.S. Department of Agriculture Administration Building	Sculptured frieze		Richard Massoni	limestone	1938	
Stewart Lee Udall US Department of the Interior Building	American Bison		Boris Gilbertson	limestone	1940	
Stewart Lee Udall US Department of the Interior Building	American Moose		Boris Gilbertson	limestone	1940	
Stewart Lee Udall US Department of the Interior Building	Negro Mother and Child		Maurice Glickman	bronze	1934	Installed 1940
Stewart Lee Udall US Department of the Interior Building	Abe Lincoln		Louis Slobodkin		1940	
Stewart Lee Udall US Department of the Interior Building	Powell Exploring the Grand Canyon		Ralph Stackpole		1940	
Stewart Lee Udall US Department of the Interior Building	Lewis & Clark		Heinz Warneke		1940	

== Florida ==
Location	Title	Image	Artist	Medium	Date	Notes
USPO Arcadia	Arcadia		Constance Ortmayer	plaster	1939	
David W. Dyer Federal Building and U.S. Courthouse, Miami	Love & Hope		Alexander Sambugnac	cast stone	1938	relief
David W. Dyer Federal Building and U.S. Courthouse, Miami	Wisdom & Courage		Alexander Sambugnac	cast stone	1938	relief

== Georgia ==
Location	Title	Image	Artist	Medium	Date	Notes
USPO Ashburn	Southern Farm Life		Maurice Glickman		1947	missing (2016)
Techwood Homes Housing Project, Atlanta	Fawn		Ahron Ben-Shmuel		1936	
USPO Cochran	The Little Farmer		Ilse Erythropel	glazed terra cotta	1940	relief
USPO Lyons	Wild Duck and Deer		Albino Manca	terra cotta	1942	relief
USPO Manchester	Game Bird Hunt		Erwin Springweiler	mahagony	1941	relief
USPO Winder	Weighing Cotton		Marion Sanford	plaster	1939	now located in Barrow County Museum
USPO Wrightsville	Transgression		Earl N. Thorp	cast stone	1940	relief

== Hawaii ==
Location	Title	Image	Artist	Medium	Date	Notes
Schofield Barracks, Honolulu	Primitive Communications		Roy King	wood	1943	

== Idaho ==
Location	Title	Image	Artist	Medium	Date	Notes
Boundary County Courthouse, Bonners Ferry	Three untitled friezes		Fletcher Martin			colloquially referred to as Floating Logs, Harvest, and Mining; NHRP-listed

== Illinois ==
Location	Title	Image	Artist	Medium	Date	Notes
USPO Abington	Post Rider		Hillis Arnold	terra cotta	1941	relief
USPO Brookfield	Means of Mail Transportation		Edouard Chassaing	plaster	1937	
USPO Carlyle	Fish Hatchery		Curt Drewes	cast stone	1939	
National Public Housing Museum (originally Jane Addams Homes), Chicago	Animal Court		Edgar Miller		1938	Seven animal figures
USPO Chicago, Kedzie-Grace	Mercury		Peterpaul Ott	aluminum	1938	
USPO Chicago,Logan Square	The Post		Hildreth Meiere	metal	1937	
USPO Evanston	The Message, The Answer		Armin Scheler	limestone	1940	reliefs
USPO Evanston	Throwing the Mail, Mail Handlers		Robert Russin	cast aluminum surfaced with gold foil	1941	
USPO Homewood	The Letter		Maurine Montgomery (Gibbs)	wood	1942	relief
USPO Kankakee	Farming		Edouard Chassaing	wood	1943	
USPO Macomb	Cow and Calf		Boris Gilbertson	wood	1943	relief in black walnut completed but not installed, collection of the Smithsonian American Art Museum
USPO Morton	Spirit of Communication		Charles Umlauf	cast stone	1939	relief
USPO Nokomis	Coal Mining		Bernard Rosenthal	wood	1947	
USPO Peoria	Postal Service, Judiciary, Agriculture, Industry		Freeman Schoolcraft	limestone	1939	
Florine Anna Martin Becker Plaza, Peoria	Peace and Harvest		Mary Andersen Clark	limestone	1939	Originally installed at the Peoria Municipal Tuberculosis Sanitarium, the pair of statues have been moved several times since the sanitarium's closure in the mid-1970s.
USPO Plano	Harvest		Peterpaul Ott	wood	1941	relief
USPO Rock Falls	Farming by Hand, Manufacture of Farm Implements		Curt Drewes	plaster	1939	relief
USPO Sandwich	The Family		Marshall Fredericks	terra cotta	1941	relief
USPO White Hall	The Potter and His Burro		Felix Schlag	plaster	1939	relief

== Indiana ==
Location	Title	Image	Artist	Medium	Date	Notes
USPO Bedford	Limestone Quarry Worker		John Fabion	terra cotta		relief
USPO Bloomfield	Waiting for the Mail		Lilian Swann Saarinen	terra cotta	1941	relief, missing
USPO Fowler	Rest During Prairie Plowing		Nat Werner	cast stone	1940	
U.S. Courthouse and Post Office, Indianapolis	Distribution of the Mail		David Rubins	limestone	1937	two panels
USPO Tell City	The Noon Mail		Laci de Greenday	wood	1939	relief

== Iowa ==
Location	Title	Image	Artist	Medium	Date	Notes
Food Sciences Building, Iowa State University, Ames	Nine bas relief panels that depict the history of dairy technology		Christian Petersen	Terra cotta	1934–1935	

== Kansas ==
Location	Title	Image	Artist	Medium	Date	Notes
Burlington Post Office, Burlington	Boy and Colt		Robert Kittredge	stone	1942	
USPO Columbus	R.F.D.		Waylande Gregory	terra cotta	1940	"crated in basement"
Fredonia Post Office, Fredonia	Delivery of the Mail to the Farm		Lenore Thomas Straus	glazed terra cotta	1939	
Smoky Hill Museum (Salina Post Office and Federal Building), Salina	Land and Communication		Carl Mose	limestone	1940	

== Kentucky ==
Location	Title	Image	Artist	Medium	Date	Notes
USPO and Courthouse, Covington	Horsebreeding, Tobacco		Carl L. Schmitz	limestone	1940	reliefs
USPO and Courthouse, Covington	Justice		Romuald Kraus	bronze	1942	replica of the sculpture created for the post office and courthouse in Newark, New Jersey
Jenkins	Miner and Daughter		F. Jean Thalinger	terra cotta	1943	reliefs, missing (2016)
USPO Springfield	Signing the Marriage Contract of Thomas Lincoln and Nancy Hanks, Kentucky Pioneer, and Woodchopper		Richard Davis	limestone	1941	
Williamstown	In Kentucky		Romauld Kraus	limestone	1942	reliefs

== Louisiana ==
Location	Title	Image	Artist	Medium	Date	Notes
USPO Leesville	The Letter		Duncan Ferguson		1939	
Many	Cotton Pickers		Julius Struppeck		1941	
F. Edward Hebert Federal Building, New Orleans	Eagle		Gifford Proctor	terra cotta	1941	4 eagles
F. Edward Hebert Federal Building, New Orleans	Flood Control		Karl Lang	limestone	1942	relief
F. Edward Hebert Federal Building, New Orleans	Harvesting Sugar Cane		Armin Scheler	limestone	1941	relief
USPO Vivian	Trade & Learning, Rural Mail, Harvest		John Tatschl	walnot	1941	reliefs

== Maine ==
Location	Title	Image	Artist	Medium	Date	Notes
USPO Dexter	News for the Woodsman		Elliott Means	wood	1941	relief
USPO Fairfield	A Letter		Joseph Walter	plaster	1939	relief
USPO Farmington	Lillian Nordica		Hetty Beatty	wood	1939	relief
Norway	Jacob Howe, First Post Rider		Margaret Vincent	wood	1942	relief

== Maryland ==
Location	Title	Image	Artist	Medium	Date	Notes
USPO Aberdeen	Commermation		Henri Brenner	plaster	1938	missing
USPO Dundalk	Welding		Harrison Gibbs	wood	1942	relief
USPO Pocomoke	The Power of Communication		Perna Krick	wood	1939	relief

== Massachusetts ==
Location	Title	Image	Artist	Medium	Date	Notes
USPO Ayer	Rural Mail		Leo Friedlander	wood	1943	relief
Old Harbor Housing Project, Boston	Fisherman, Industry, Farmer & Blacksmith		George Aarons		1938	
Old Harbor Housing Project, Boston			Frederick Brunner		1937	
USPO Chicopee	4 carved grilles in lobby		Frederick Brunner	wood	1936	
USPO Clinton	History of a Letter		Theodore Barbarossa	plaster	1939	relief
Foxboro	Straw Cutting and Weaving		Arnold Geissbuhler	wood	1941	relief
Greenfield	Planting, Reaping, Mother and Child		Hélène Sardeau		1941	
Hyannis	Cape Cod Fishermen		Benjamin Hawkins	cast stone	1940	relief
USPO Mansfield	Farmers & Geese		Joseph Coletti	plaster	1939	relief
USPO North Adams	Mohawk Trail Workers, Mills Digging Tunnel		Louis Slobodkin	cast stone	1942	reliefs
USPO Orange	The Builders of Orange		Oronzio Maldarelli	plaster	1939	relief
USPO Saugus	Historic Saugus		Robert Penn	aluminum	1941	relief
USPO Stoneham	Shoemakers of Stoneham		William Zorach	terra cotta		relief
USPO Wakefield	Two medallions, Benjamin Franklin and George Washington		Fortunato Tarquinio	marble	1936	reliefs on facade
USPO West Springfield	The New England Post Rider		Walker Hancock	plaster	1938	relief
USPO Whitinsville	Colonel Paul Whitin, Blacksmith		Milton Horn	plaster	1939	relief
USPO Whitman	Liberty		Attilio Piccirilli	plaster	1940	relief
USPO Winchendon	Industry and landscape of Winchendon		Minna Harkavy	wood	1942	relief
USPO Wollaston	Welder		George Kratina	wood	1942	relief

== Michigan ==
Location	Title	Image	Artist	Medium	Date	Notes
Michigan League, University of Michigan Central Campus Historic District, Ann Arbor	Sea Nymph		Clivia Calder	glazed ceramic, concrete	1938	Sponsored by the Michigan League, a women's league at the University of Michigan; located in the Eula D. Marcks Courtyard Garden
Belle Isle Bridge, Detroit	Father Gabriel Richard		Leonard Jungwirth	granite	c. 1938	
Sarah Langdon Williams Hall, Michigan State University, East Lansing	Children Reading		Clivia Calder Morrison	glazed terra cotta	c. 1938	
USPO Highland Park	American Eagle		Erwin Springweiler	granite	1940	
USPO Iron River	Paul Bunyan Straightening Out the Round River		Milton Horn	wood	1941	relief
John F. Dye Water Conditioning Plant, Lansing	Aquarius		Samuel Cashwan	Concrete	1938–39	exterior relief
John F. Dye Water Conditioning Plant, Lansing	Water Nymphs		Clivia Calder	glazed terra cotta	1941	fountain in lobby
USPO Mason	Early Postman		Marion Overby	terra cotta	1939	
USPO Munising	Harbor of Munising Chippewa Leggend		Hugo Robus	wood	1939	relief
USPO River Rouge	The Horseless Carriage		Marshall Fredericks	stone	1939	relief
USPO Rochester	Communication		Alexander Sambugnac	cast stone	1939	
Royal Oak Post Office, Royal Oak	The First Harvest, Pioneer Family		Sidney Loeb		1940	reliefs missing as of 2012
USPO Traverse City	The Cherry Picker		Marion Overby	wood	1941	relief missing as of 2012

== Minnesota ==
Location	Title	Image	Artist	Medium	Date	Notes
USPO						
Park Rapids	Indian, Lumberjack, Park Service Symbol		Alonzo Hauser	plaster	1941	
St. Cloud	Mississippi Divides the Southwest from the Northeast		Brenda Putnam	plaster	1939	relief, moved to Minnesota Department of Manpower Services Building

== Mississippi ==
Location	Title	Image	Artist	Medium	Date	Notes
Carthage	Lumberman Rolling a Log		Peter Dalton	wood	1941	relief
Ripley	Development of the Postal Service		George Aarons	cast stone	1939	3 reliefs; moved to new Ripley post office

== Missouri ==
Location	Title	Image	Artist	Medium	Date	Notes
USPO La Plata	Missouri Livestock		Emma Lou Davis	wood	1939	relief
USPO Maplewood	Family Group		Carl Mose	wood	1942	relief

== New Hampshire ==
Location	Title	Image	Artist	Medium	Date	Notes
Derry	Town of Derry		Vladimir Yoffe	plaster	1938	relief

== New Jersey ==
Location	Title	Image	Artist	Medium	Date	Notes
USPO Boonton	Morning Mail		Enid Bell	wood	1939	relief
USPO Caldwell	Sorting the Mail		Brenda Putnam	plaster	1937	lunette, in storage (2016)
Westfield Acres Housing Project, Camden	Workers		Ahron Ben-Shmuel		1937	
USPO Cliffside Park	Rural Delivery		Bruno Neri	plaster	1938	relief
USPO Garfield	The Transportation of Mail		Robert Laurent		1937	
USPO Haddon Heights	The Letter		Isamu Noguchi	cast stone	1939	relief
USPO Hammonton	Harvest		Spero Anageros		1940	relief, missing (2016)
USPO Harrison	Industry and the Family		Murray Roper	plaster	1940	relief
USPO Linden	Industry		Sahl Swarz	terra cotta	1940	
USPO Matawan	Phillip Freneau Freeing His Slaves, Rural Mill, Old Hospital, Old Greenwood Institute, First Presbyterian Church		Armin Scheler	plaster	1939	reliefs
USPO Metuchen	Gardeners		Harold Ambellam	plaster	1942	relief
USPO Mt. Holly	The Post-1790		Enid Bell	wood	1937	relief
New Brunswick Main Post Office, New Brunswick	The Dispatch Rider		Ruth Nickerson		1937	missing (2016)
Frank R. Lautenberg Post Office and Courthouse, Newark	Justice		Romuald Kraus	bronze	1938	located in the center of the rotunda on the third floor of the building
Frank R. Lautenberg Post Office and Courthouse, Newark	Aluminum silhouettes		Vicken Totten	aluminum	1935	Two medallions representing light and darkness
USPO Paterson	Postman and Hawthorne Bush		Ilse Erythropel	wood	1942	relief
USPO Paulsboro	Oil Refining		Nena de Brennecke	wood	1940	3 reliefs
USPO Pitman	The Four Winds		Nathaniel Choate	plaster	1937	relief
USPO Pompton	Benjamin Franklin		Alexander Stirling Calder	cast stone	1939	
USPO Ridgewood	Man Woman		Romuald Kraus	metal	1940	reliefs
USPO South River	Construction		Maurice Glickman	wood	1943	relief
Toms River	Boating on Barnegat Bay		Milton Hebald		1941	missing (2016)
USPO Westwood	Pegasus		Hunt Diederich	metal	1937	destroyed
Perth Amboy Public Library, Perth Amboy	Children's fairy tales murals			cast-plaster reliefs		Originally created for children's library building which burned down in 1977. Survived fire and are now displayed in children's section of the main library.

== New Mexico ==
Location	Title	Image	Artist	Medium	Date	Notes
Richardson Pavilion, University of New Mexico Children's Hospital, Albuquerque	Mercy		Oliver LaGrone	cast marblestone	1937	Originally made for the Carrie Tingley Hospital for Children in Hot Springs, New Mexico.

== New York ==
Location	Title	Image	Artist	Medium	Date	Notes
USPO Angola	A Pioneer Woman's Bravery		Leopold Scholz	cast stone relief	1940	
USPO Bay Shore	Speed		Wheeler Williams		1937	
USPO Canton	Stillman Foote Acquires Homestead of John Harrington		Berta Margoulies	painted plaster	1939	relief
USPO Cooperstown	figures of James Fenimore Cooper, Natty Bumppo, and Chingachgook		Bela Janowsky	bronze	1937	relief
USPO Courtland	Valley of the Seven Hills		Ryah Ludins	painted wood	1943	relief
USPO Fairport	The Harvest		Henry Van Wolf	bronze	1939	relief
USPO Flushing, Forest Hills	The Spirit of Communication		Sten W. J. Jacobsson	terracotta	1938	
USPO Frankfort	Growth		Albert Wein	wood	1942	relief
USPO Geneva	Eagle, Industry, Education, Agriculture, and Aviation		Theodore Barbarossa	cast stone	1938	reliefs
USPO Great Neck	American Eagle		Gaetano Cecere		1940	sunken relief
USPO Hamilton	Messengers of the Mail		Humbert Albriziio		1938	relief
USPO Hudson	Evolution of Transportation		Vincent Glinsky	cast stone	1938	five reliefs
USPO Ilion	Eliphalet Remington		Edmond Amateis		1937	relief
USPO Lowville	Joy in the Earth		Helen Wilson	terra cotta	1941	relief
USPO Moravia	Jethro Wood making the first all metal plough in Monrovia		Kenneth Washburn	terra cotta	1942	relief
USPO NYC, Bronx	The Letter		Henry Kreis	limestone	1938	facade
USPO NYC, Bronx	Noah		Charles Rudy	limestone	1938	facade
USPO NYC, Madison Square	Communication and Transportation		Edmond Amateis		1937	
USPO NYC, Madison Square	Communication By Sight		Louis Slobodkin, Edmond Amaties	bronze	1937	5 reliefs
NYC, Canal Street Station	Indian Bowman		Wheeler Williams	terra cotta	1938	relief
NYC, Station "O"	Bear and Deer		Paul Fiene	cast stone	1938	
NYC, Harlem-McCombs Housing Project	Tumbling Bears, Penguins, Kneeling Figures		Heinz Warneke		1938	
USPO Orchard Park	In the Park		Francis P. De Luna	walnut	1943	relief
USPO Ossining	Landing of the Mail		Helene Sardeau		1938	
USPO Oyster Bay	Theodore Roosevelt, Animals		Leo Lentelli	terra cotta	1937	
USPO Suffern	Communication		Elliott Means	plaster	1938	relief

== North Carolina ==
Location	Title	Image	Artist	Medium	Date	Notes
USPO Canton	Paper		Sam Bell	terra cotta	1941	reliefs
USPO Dunn	Cotton & Tobacco		Paul Rudin		1939	relief
USPO Eden, formerly Leaksville	American Oriental Rug Weaving		Ruth Nickerson	glazed terra cotta	1941	
USPO Elkin	Early Days at Elkin		Anita Weschler		1939	
USPO Forest City	Rural Delivery		Duane Champlain	plaster	1939	relief
USPO Hamlet	Peaches, Drilling, and Dewberries		Nena de Brennecke	mahogany	1942	reliefs
USPO Marion	Unity		Bruno Piccirilli		1939	
USPO and Court House Statesville	Freeman Prosper and Defending Freedom		Sahl Swarz	wood	1948	freestanding, in courtroom
USPO Weldon	Early Childhood of Virginia Dare		Jean de Marco	plaster	1940	relief
USPO Wilmington	History and present day themes relating to Wilmington and its surroundings		Thomas Lo Medico	plaster	1937	8 reliefs

== North Dakota ==
Location	Title	Image	Artist	Medium	Date	Notes
Lisbon	Family Group		James L. Hansen	terra cotta	1944	never displayed, relocated to Augustana University in Sioux Falls, South Dakota

== Ohio ==
Location	Title	Image	Artist	Medium	Date	Notes
USPO Campbell	Iron & Steel Industry		Joseph Walter	terra cotta	1941	relief
USPO Chagrin Falls	Stone Quarries		Moissaye Marans	wood	1943	
Cleveland Museum of Natural History, Cleveland	Bruno the Bear		William McVey	limestone	ca. 1933	
USPO Lakeview Terrace Housing Project, Cleveland	Early History		William McVey		1936	
USPO Clyde	Agriculture		William Krusen	wood	1939	
USPO Crooksville	Potter		Thomas Lo Medico	terra cotta	1939	relief
Army Aeronautical Museum, Wright Field, Dayton	Flight		Seth M. Velsey		1936	
USPO Leetonia	Industries & Agriculture of Leetonia		Lenore Thomas	terra cotta	1941	relief
USPO Loudonville	The Mailman		Rudolf Henn	plaster	1938	
USPO Miamisburg	Indian and Trader		Leo Schulemowitz	wood	1942	relief
USPO Middleport	The Family		Clara Fasano		1939	
USPO Newcomerstown	Men & Machines		Casare Stea	plaster	1939	bas relief
USPO Paulding	Industry		Charles Umlauf	mahogany	1941	bas relief
USPO Pomeroy	Salt' Coal		Seth Velsey	wood	1940	relief
USPO Struthers	Citizens		W. Bimel Kehm	plaster	1940	
USPO Sylvania	Trilobites		Melik Finkle	plaster	1940	relief
USPO Woodsfield	The Clearing		Joseph Scott	wood	1941	
USPO Worthington	Scioto Company Settler		Vernon Carlock	terra cotta	1939	relief
Muskingum Park, Marietta	Start Westward Memorial		Gutzon Borglum	stone	1938	WPA

== Pennsylvania ==
Location	Title	Image	Artist	Medium	Date	Notes
USPO Blawnox	The Steel Worker and Family		Mildred Jerome	wood	1941	relief, missing (2006)
USPO Bloomsburg	Pennsylvania Farming		Roy King	walnut	1937	relief
USPO Boyertown	Harvest, Transfer of Skills, Education, and Barnyard		Moissaya Marans	plaster	1941	relief
USPO Chester	William Penn		Erwin Springweiler	metal	1938	Sculpture of William Penn
USPO Clarks Summit	Communication by Mail		Harry Camden	aluminum	1939	
USPO Conshohocken	Steel Workers		Robert Russin	wood	1942	relief
USPO Coraopolis	Racoon, Deer, and Fox		Nena de Brennecke	wood	1940	3 reliefs
USPO Coudersport	Lumbering in Potter County 1815–1920		Ernest Lohrmann	plaster	1939	relief
USPO Danville	Iron Pouring		Jean De Marco	aluminum	1941	
USPO Drexel Hill	Aborigines		Concetta Scaravaglione	wood	1942	relief
USPO East Stroudsburg	Communication		Bennett Kassler		1937	
Erie Federal Courthouse and Post Office, Erie	American Youth		Henry Kreis	aluminum	1940	
USPO Everett	Signing of the Constitution		Hazel Clere	plaster	1940	
USPO Girard	Vacation Time		Janet de Coux	wood	1942	relief, in storage (1984)
USPO Hamburg	Home		Nathaniel Kaz	wood	1941	relief
USPO Irwin	Puddlers		Chaim Gross	wood	1942	relief, moved to new post office
USPO Johnstown	eagles		Louis Slobodkin	granite	1938	"building reportedly sold"
USPO Lititz	The Moravian Communion, Lititz Springs Picnic		Joseph Nicolosi	wood	1941	relief
USPO Mahanoy City	Coal Miners Returning From Work		Malvina Hoffman	plaster	1939	
USPO McDonald	Agriculture and Industry		August Jaegers	Plaster, aluminum finished	1937	relief
USPO Mercersburg	Good News		Joseph Nicolosi	plaster	1938	relief
USPO Meyersdale	Harvesters at Rest		Fred De Lorenzo	plaster	1940	relief
USPO Midland	Steel Workers		Humbert Albrizio		1940	
USPO Mifflinburg	Pioneers of the Community		Bennett Kassler	plaster	1941	4 relief panels
USPO Milton	Transportation		Louis A. Maene	bronze and stone	1936	bronze plaque, 7 stone reliefs
USPO Mount Pleasant	Air Mail		Alexander Sambugnac	plaster	1937	relief
USPO North East	The Town Crier		Leo Lentelli	cast stone	1937	moved to new library
USPO Northampton	Physical Changes of the Postman through the Ages		Maurice Glickman	cast stone	1939	relief
USPO Northumberland	Dr. Joseph Priestley		Tina Melicov	red mahogany	1942	relief
USPO Oakmont	Allegheny River		Franc Epping	terra cotta	1942	relief
USPO Palmyra	The Oldest Church in the Valley, Ploughing		Alice Decker	wood	1940	reliefs
Nix Federal Building and United States Post Office, Philadelphia	Mail Delivery North, South, East and West		Edmond Amateis	stone	1941	4 relief panels
Nix Federal Building and United States Post Office, Philadelphia	Law and Justice, two eagles		Donald De Lue	stone	1940	2 relief panels
USPO Pittston	Indian, Mine Elevator, Campbell's Ledge		Marion Walton	limestone	1942	reliefs
USPO Swarthmore	The Spirit of the Post		Milton Horn	wood	1937	relief
USPO Turtle Creek	Treaty of William Penn and the Indians		Mildred Jerome	wood	1939	relief
USPO Union City	The Lumberman		Vincent Glinsky	Wood	1941	relief
USPO Wyomissing	Industry		Cesare Stea	terra cotta	1941	relief, "1979, destroyed in natural gas explosion"
USPO York	Prayer for Thanksgiving		George Kratina	wood	1946	missing, (2016)
York	Singing Thanksgiving		Carl Schmitz	wood	1946	missing, (2016)

== Rhode Island ==
Location	Title	Image	Artist	Medium	Date	Notes
USPO Providence	Transportation, Distribution of the Mail, American Eagle		Raymond Barger	stone	1940	

== South Carolina ==
Location	Title	Image	Artist	Medium	Date	Notes
USPO Bishopville	The Saw Mill		Hans Prehn	plaster	1942	relief
USPO & Agriculture Building, Chesterfield	The Farmer's Letters		Bruno Mankowski	plaster	1939	relief
USPO Easley	Cultivation of Corn		Renzo Fenci	terra cotta	1942	relief

== South Dakota ==
Location	Title	Image	Artist	Medium	Date	Notes
Aberdeen Federal Building, Aberdeen	Building of Grand Crossing		Laci de Gerenday	walnut	1940	relief; originally installed at the adjacent U.S. Post Office and Courthouse
USPO Spearfish	Fish Story		Marion Overby	california walnut	1943	3 reliefs

== Tennessee ==
Location	Title	Image	Artist	Medium	Date	Notes
Joel W. Solomon Federal Building and United States Courthouse, Chattanooga	The Mail Carrier		Leopold Scholz	cast aluminum	1938	former post office
USPO and Court House, Columbia	American Eagle		Sidney Waugh		1941	
USPO Decherd	News on the Job		Enea Biafora	wood	1940	relief
USPO and Court House, Greeneville	Manpower, Natural Resources		William Zorach	wood	1940	reliefs
Court House Nashville	Portrait bust of Admiral Albert Gleaves		Belle Kinney		1940	missing
USPO Rockwood	Wild Life		Christian Heinrich	terra cotta	1939	

== Texas ==
Location	Title	Image	Artist	Medium	Date	Notes
USPO Bryan	Bison Hunt		William Gordon Hunt	plaster	1941	relief
USPO Electra	Oil, Cattle, and Wheat		Allie Tennant	plaster	1940	3 reliefs
USPO Hereford	On the Range		Enid Bell	wood	1941	relief
Federal Building, Houston	Travis' Letter from the Alamo; Sam Houston's Report on the Battle of San Jacinto		William McVey	tymstone	1941	missing (2016)
USPO Kenedy	Propellers					
USPO Littlefield	West Texas		William McVey	tymstone	1948	
USPO Waco	Indians and Cattle		Eugenie Shonnard	wood	1939	reliefs

== Virginia ==
Location	Title	Image	Artist	Medium	Date	Notes
USPO Covington	Rural Life		Lenore Thomas	glazed terra cotta	1939	3 reliefs
USPO Marion	Pastoral Theme		Daniel Olney	plaster	1937	
USPO and Court House, Newport News	Early Industries, Present Day Industries, Captain Newport Brings News and Aid to the Starving Colonists		Mary B. Fowler	terra cotta	1943	
USPO Staunton	The First Reaper		Florence Bessom	terra cotta	1940	relief

== Washington ==
Location	Title	Image	Artist	Medium	Date	Notes
Clarkston Main Post Office, Clarkston	Lewis and Clark		Donlon McGovern	wood	1940	relief
USPO Kent	From Far Away		Zygmund Sazevich	wood	1941	3 reliefs
USPO Longview	From Far Away			metal		5

== West Virginia ==
Location	Title	Image	Artist	Medium	Date	Notes
USPO Kenova	Worker		Albino Cavallito		1941	missing, (2016)
USPO Logan	The Letter		Gleb Derujinsky		1939	
USPO Oak Hill	The Colonial Mail Rider		Henri Crenier		1938	
USPO Ripley	The Pride of Jackson County		Joseph Servas	wood	1942	
St. Albans Post Office, St. Albans	Science and Industry		Reuben Krammer	wood	1941	originally installed at the Old St. Albans Post Office; moved, along with postal services, to a new location in 1986
USPO Spencer	Pastoral of Spencer		Vicken von Post Totten	plaster of Paris	1938	
USPO Webster Springs	Springtime		Lenore Thomas	glazed terra cotta		
USPO Weirton	Pony Express-Rural Delivery		Vincent Glinsky	cast stone	1940	missing, (2016)

== Wisconsin ==
Location	Title	Image	Artist	Medium	Date	Notes
Fond du Lac Post Office, Fond du Lac	Birds and Animals of the Northwest		Boris Gilbertson	limestone	1937	11 exterior reliefs
Janesville Post Office, Janesville	Wild Ducks		Boris Gilbertson	aluminum	1940	Four panels hanging vertically as a single unit. The panels now hang individually at the newer Janesville post office building.
Monument Park, Parklawn housing development, Milwaukee	Fishing and Music		Karl Kahlich	limestone	1938	
Prairie du Chien Post Office, Prairie du Chien	Discovery of Northern Waters of the Mississippi		Jefferson E. Greer	plaster	1938	

== Wyoming ==
Location	Title	Image	Artist	Medium	Date	Notes
Yellowstone Main Post Office, Mammoth, Yellowstone National Park	Young Grizzly Bears		Gladys Caldwell Fisher	stone	1941	Pair of carved sculptures

== See also ==
- List of New Deal murals
- List of United States post office murals
- List of Art Deco architecture in the United States
