= Monticello Post Office =

- U.S. National Register of Historic Places
- U.S. Historic district – Contributing property
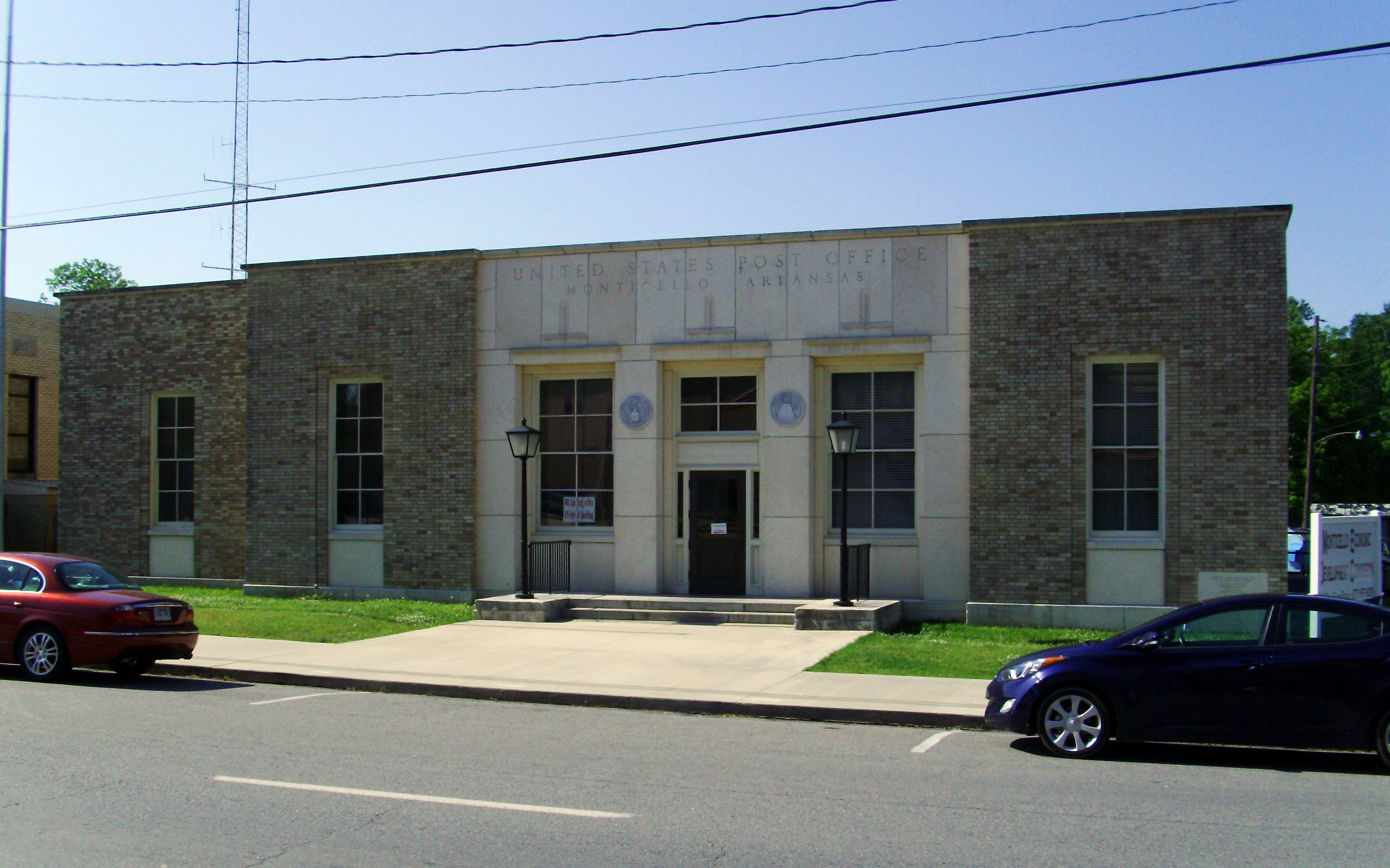
- The post office in May 2014

- Location within Arkansas Location within the United States
- Location: 211 W. Gaines St., Monticello, Arkansas
- Coordinates: 33.6289°N 91.7922°W
- Area: less than one acre
- Built: 1937
- Sculptor: Berta Margoulies
- Architectural style: Art Deco
- MPS: Post Offices with Section Art in Arkansas MPS
- NRHP reference No.: 98000920
- Added to NRHP: August 14, 1998

The Monticello Post Office is a historic post office building at 211 West Gaines Street in Monticello, Arkansas. The single-story brick Art Deco building was built in 1937. In 1941 a terra cotta sculpture by Berta Margoulies entitled Tomato Sculpture was installed in the building, which was funded in part by the Section of Painting and Sculpture of the United States Department of the Treasury.

The building was listed on the National Register of Historic Places in 1998. It is used as the offices of the Monticello Economic Development Commission.

== See also ==
- National Register of Historic Places listings in Drew County, Arkansas
- List of United States post offices
- List of New Deal sculpture
