= Prairie du Chien Post Office =

- U.S. National Register of Historic Places
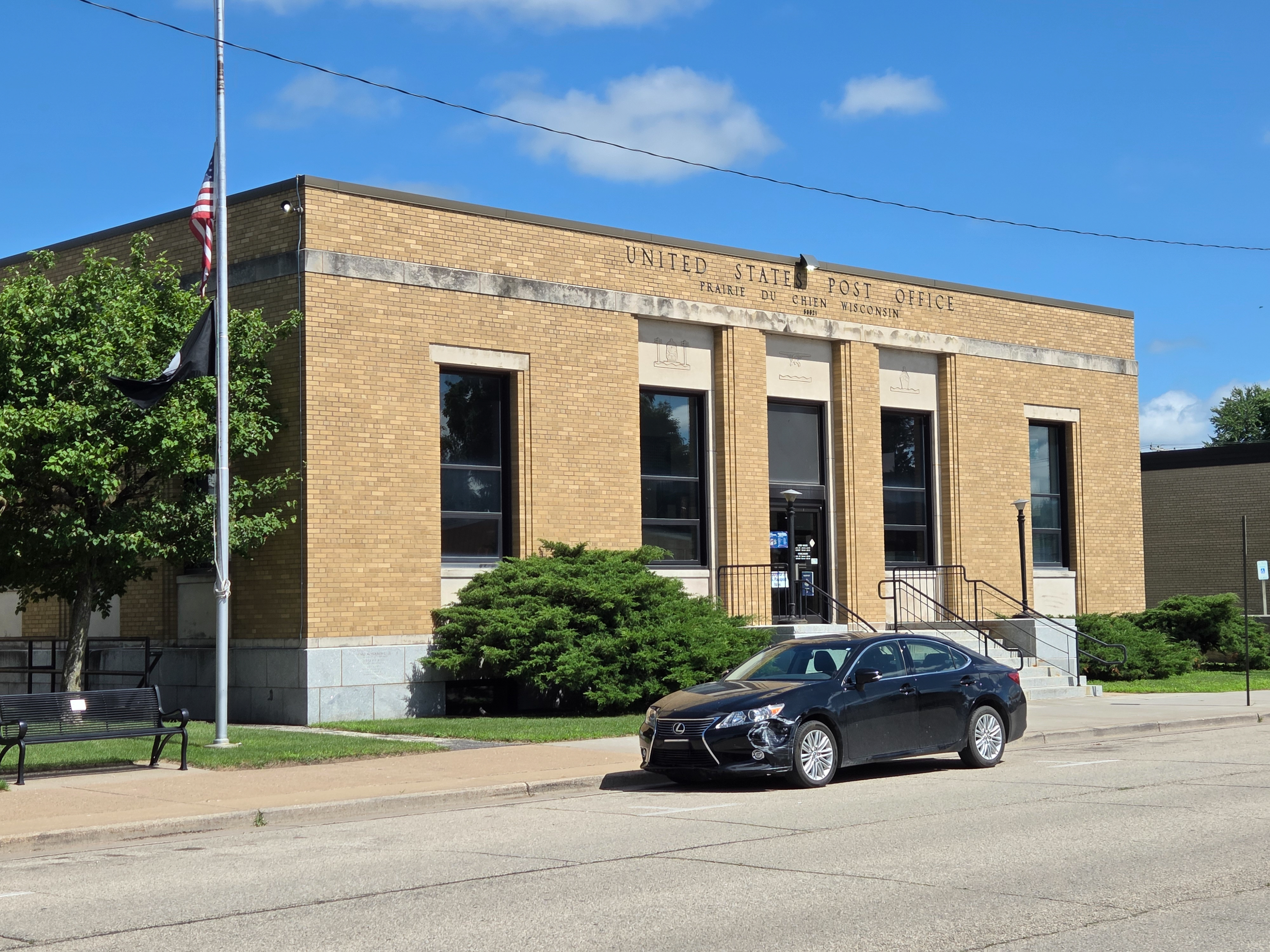
- Prairie du Chien Post Office

- Location within Wisconsin Location within the United States
- Location: 120 S. Beaumont Rd. Prairie du Chien, Wisconsin
- Coordinates: 43°03′03″N 91°08′46″W
- Architectural style: Modern Movement
- NRHP reference No.: 00001263
- Added to NRHP: October 24, 2000

The Prairie du Chien Post Office is a historic post office building at 120 S. Beaumont Road in Prairie du Chien, Wisconsin. It was added to the National Register of Historic Places in 2000.

== History ==
The post office was built as part of the Works Progress Administration of the New Deal. Like many government buildings of the New Deal era, it has a modernist design with minimal decoration. The interior features a relief sculpture by Jefferson Greer titled Discovery of the Northern Waters of the Mississippi. The work, which was commissioned by the Public Works Administration in 1938, depicts Jacques Marquette and Louis Jolliet discovering the confluence of the Mississippi River and Wisconsin River near modern-day Prairie du Chien. Greer was a Milwaukee-based sculptor who assisted in the design of Mount Rushmore; the Prairie du Chien relief is his only post office work.

== See also ==
- List of New Deal sculpture
