= Ruth Nickerson =

American sculptor (1905-1997)

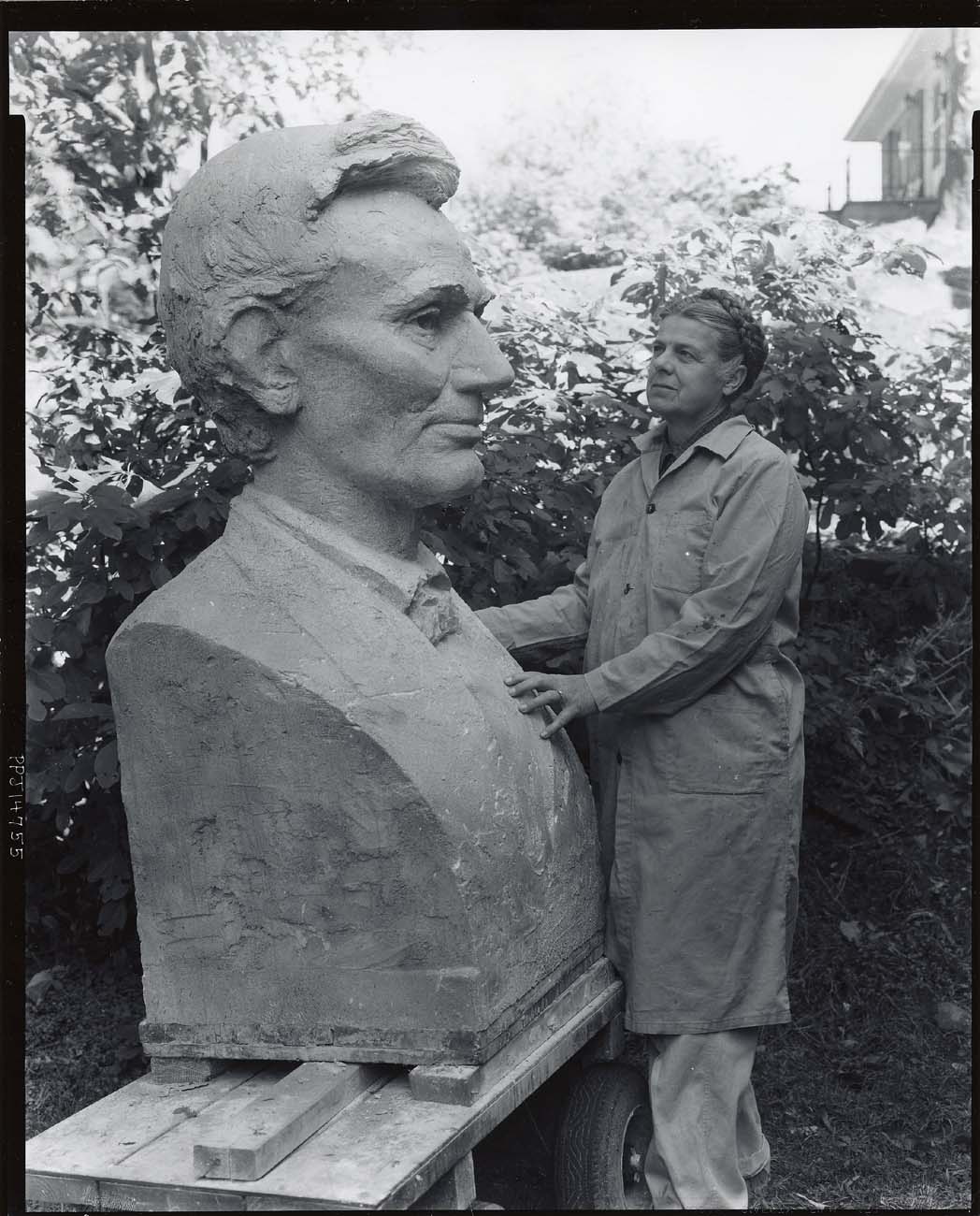
- Nickerson with one of her sculptures
- Born: November 23, 1905; Appleton, Wisconsin, U.S.
- Died: March 31, 1997 (aged 91); Valhalla, New York, U.S.
- Education: Detroit School of Applied Art; National Academy of Design; Beaux-Arts Institute of Design
- Spouse: Edmund Greacen Jr. (m. 1935; died 1970)
- Relatives: Edmund Greacen (father-in-law)
- Awards: Guggenheim Fellowship (1946)

Jennie Ruth Nickerson (November 23, 1905 – March 31, 1997) was an American sculptor who worked in stone carving. She made several works for the Federal Art Project and was a 1946 Guggenheim Fellow.

== Biography ==
=== Early life and education ===
Ruth Nickerson was born on November 23, 1905, in Appleton, Wisconsin. Her parents Kate Mary (née Ellis) and Robert Wellington Nickerson were Canadian. Originally raised in Palm Beach, Florida, she became interested in sculpture as a young child after she saw her brother carve a taro for school. She moved to Canada where she graduated from Simcoe Collegiate Institute.

Nickerson began studying at the Detroit School of Applied Art in 1924, before moving to New York City to attend the National Academy of Design and the Beaux-Arts Institute of Design. Her teachers were Samuel Cashwan, Robert Ingersoll Aitken, and Ahron Ben-Shmuel. She had to work as an advertising agency receptionist to pay for school tuition.

=== Art career ===
In 1932, Nickerson started her own studio at 14th Street after failing to find a well-known sculptor to apprentice her, a decision she attributed to misogyny. She also worked as a teacher at the Nicholas Roerich Museum (1933-1934), Westchester Art Workshop (1947-1968), and the National Academy School of Fine Arts (1979-1981), as well as the Grand Central School of Art and Scarsdale Art Guild.

In 1934, Nickerson had a one-woman exhibition at the Nicholas Roerich Museum. She made several works for the Federal Art Project: The Dispatch Rider (1937), a tympanum erected for the New Brunswick, New Jersey post office; Learning (1937), a three-figure pink Tennessee marble stone group at the Brooklyn Public Library's children branch; and American Oriental Rug Weaving (1941), a terra cotta sculpture at the Leaksville post office in Eden, North Carolina. Her work also appeared at the 1938 Whitney Biennial, as well as at the Metropolitan Museum of Art and the Museum of Modern Art. She was also part of the Scarsdale Art Association and White Plains Civic Art Commission.

Nickerson won the 1933 Saltus Gold Medal for her work Slav Madonna, which was later installed at the NAD. She won a 1933 National Arts Club Medal, a 1936 American Artists Professional League Medal, and a 1939 Montclair Art Museum Medal. She was admitted to the National Academy of Design as an associate in 1945, before being admitted as a national academician in 1966. In 1946, she was awarded a Guggenheim Fellowship for sculpture. She once received the National Sculpture Society Therese Wright Prize. In 1995, the National Sculpture Society honored her for her distinguished contributions to American art.

Nickerson specialized in stone carving, especially with Tennessee marble. Her sculptures were done under the direct method, where she would sculpt directly into her base through a sketch and chisel. Her daughter Barbara recalled that her sculptures "were inspired by the Bible and ordinary people". By 1960, she had carved hundreds of small sculptures, which were normally at most two feet tall.

=== Personal life and death ===
Nickerson married Edmund Greacen Jr., son of painter Edmund Greacen, on December 30, 1935 in New York City; they had two daughters and were married until his death in 1970. Originally living in New York City and Scarsdale, New York, she moved to White Plains, New York in 1946. She was a member of the Scarsdale Community Baptist Church, as well as a Republican.

Nickerson died on March 31, 1997 at Westchester Medical Center in Valhalla, New York, aged 91. Her papers were later deposited at the Archives of American Art, including a memoir by her daughter Elizabeth Knudsen, unpublished at the time but later self-published, The Stone Carver in the House (2005).
