= Clarkston Main Post Office =

Historic building in Washington, U.S.

- US Post Office–Clarkston Main
- U.S. National Register of Historic Places
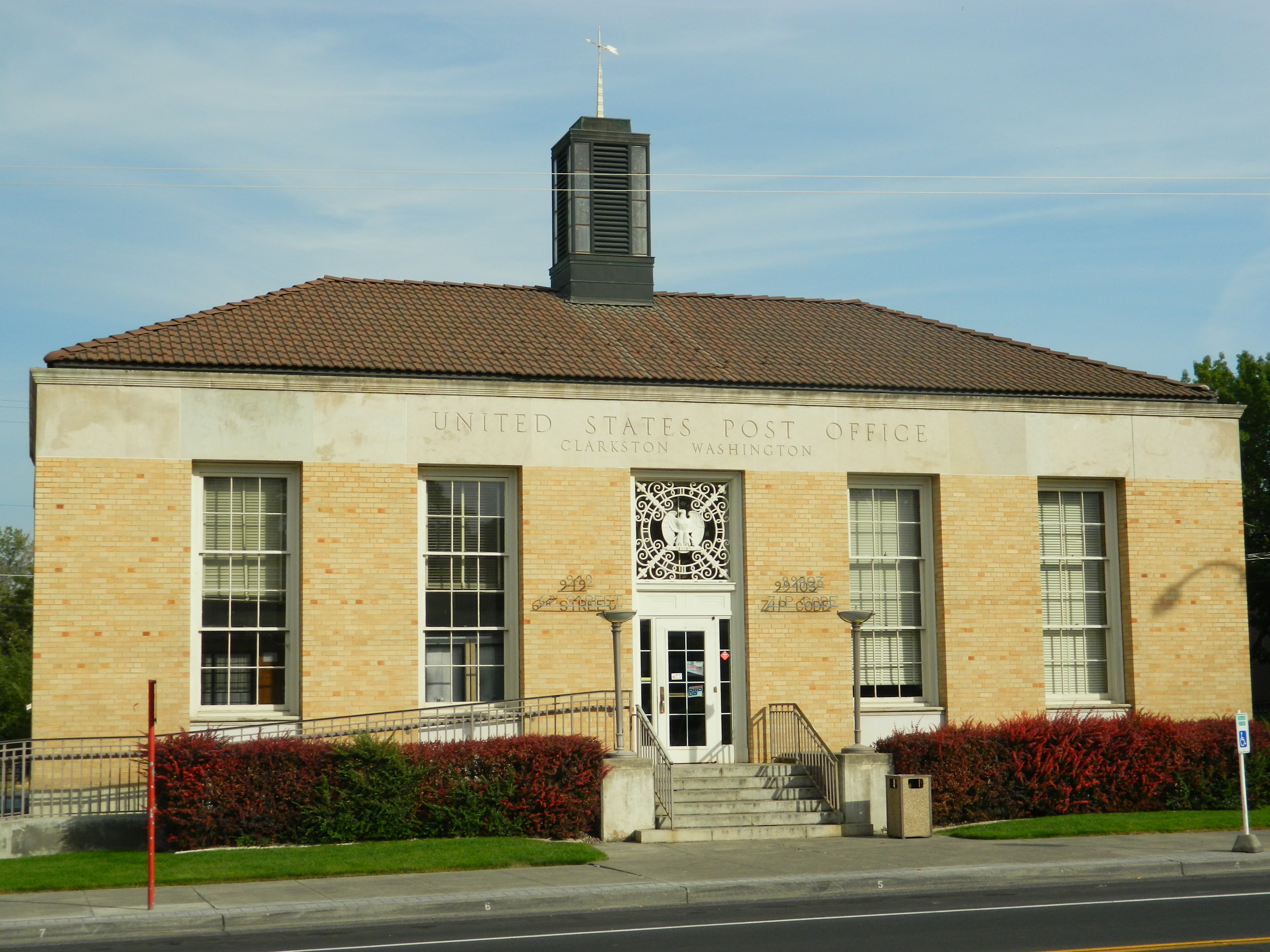

- Location within Washington (state) Location within the United States
- Location: 949 6th Street, Clarkston, Washington
- Coordinates: 46°24′40″N 117°02′43″W
- Area: 0.35 acres (0.14 ha)
- Built: 1941
- Built by: J.D. McGovern
- Architect: Louis A. Simon
- Architectural style: Colonial Revival, Moderne
- MPS: Historic US Post Offices in Washington MPS
- NRHP reference No.: 91000642
- Added to NRHP: May 30, 1991

The Clarkston Main Post Office in Clarkston in Asotin County, Washington, is a historic post office building built in 1941. It was listed on the National Register of Historic Places as U.S. Post Office – Clarkston Main in 1991.

Its design was credited to Supervising Architect Louis A. Simon. It is a one-story, buff-colored brick building on a raised concrete basement. It has a five-bay front facade. It has an "ornate painted aluminum grille, in which a low-relief sculpted eagle is centered, is set in front of the transom window" above the front door.

== Physical Appearance ==
The front facade (west) is divided into five flat-arched bays, with the main entry bay positioned at the center. This entry bay is slightly set back from the brick-faced facade and surrounded by a wooden frame. It features double metal doors with six-light glass panels and a nine-light transom window above, which is supported by a simple wooden door header. In front of the transom window, there is an ornate painted aluminum grille with a low-relief sculpted eagle at its center. Each of the entry buttresses is adorned with a single free-standing lantern designed in a torch motif.

The window bays on either side of the entry bay mirror each other in design and size. They feature triple-hung, six-light wood sash windows positioned above plain sandstone panels. These panels are slightly recessed and rest on the limestone facing the raised basement wall. A plain limestone frieze runs horizontally across the facade, extending from the tops of the bays to a slightly projecting sandstone cornice. The frieze bears the inscription "United States Post Office" and "Clarkston, Washington."

The hipped roof, covered in tiles, is crowned by a square cupola. The cupola consists of a copper base with centered copper louvers, flanked by four-light glass panels, and a flat copper cap. Atop the cap, there is a weather vane.

Moving to the north facade, it is flat and divided into two sections, with the front section slightly projecting compared to the rear. Each section contains two window bays that are identical in design and detail to those on the front facade. Sandstone is used for the exposed basement wall, frieze above the window bays, and cornice. The remaining portion of the facade is constructed from brick. The hipped roof covers the front section, while the rear section has a flat built-up tar composition roof.

The south facade closely resembles the north facade, with the exception that one window bay is filled with brick from the original construction. On each side of the bricked-in window, there are one-over-one-light, double-hung, wood sash windows.

Turning to the rear facade, it shares a similar design and material choices with the front facade. However, instead of an entry, there is a brick-enclosed concrete loading platform. This platform extends rearward and is slightly offset from the building's center. It opens to the north with a single metal overhead loading door and a single metal pedestrian door. The west and south sides of the loading platform are constructed with solid brick walls. A flat roof with a metal marquee extends over the loading area. On each side of the platform, there are two window bays, which are identical to those found on the front and sides of the main building. Additionally, in the northern corner, there is a smaller vertically-aligned window featuring one-over-one-light, double-hung, wood sash.

== See also ==
- List of New Deal sculpture
