= Boris Gilbertson =

American sculptor

- American Bison (1939), limestone relief at the Stewart Lee Udall Department of the Interior Building, Washington, D.C.
- Born: 1907; Evanston, Illinois
- Died: 1982 (aged 74–75); Santa Fe, New Mexico
- Education: Art Institute of Chicago

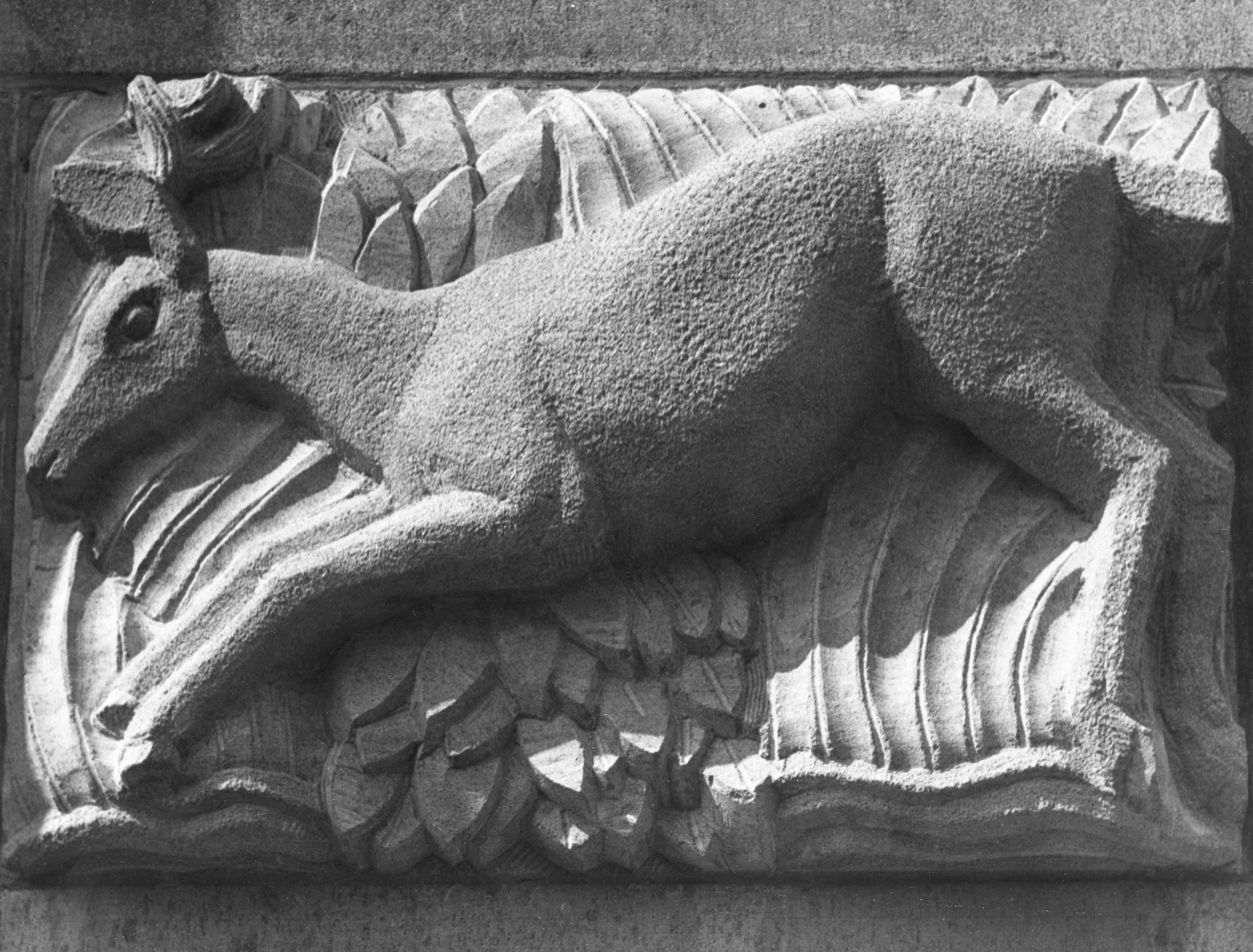
One of the 11 limestone reliefs making up Birds and Animals of the Northwest (1937), Gilbertson's sculpture at the United States post office in Fond du Lac, Wisconsin

Boris Gilbertson (1907–1982) was an American sculptor.

== Early years ==
Gilbertson was born in Evanston, Illinois in 1907 to a Norwegian-Russian family and spent much of his childhood with his grandparents outside Chicago, Illinois. He began studies in physics at the University of Chicago but soon switched to art and enrolled at this School of the Art Institute of Chicago. He married Genevieve Van Metre and they made their home in Bayfield County, Wisconsin.

Gilbertson moved to Santa Fe, New Mexico, in 1960. He died in 1982.

== Work ==
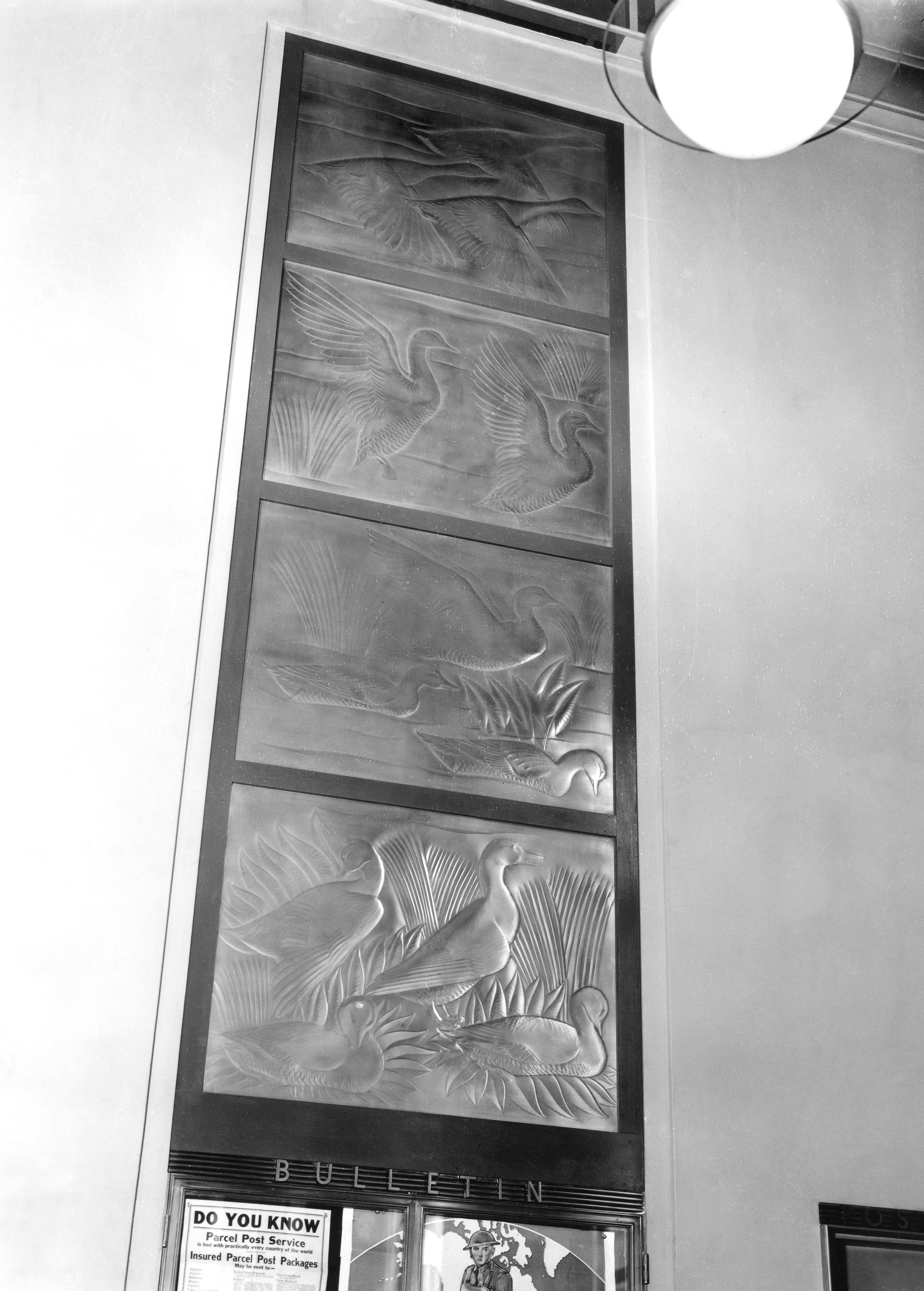
Wild Ducks (1940), four-panel aluminum relief created for the New Deal post office in Janesville, Wisconsin. Installed vertically as a single unit at the original location, the panels now hang individually at the newer Janesville post office building.

Much of Gilbertson's work consisted of sculpted reliefs that were commissions for public buildings, including post office buildings, courthouses and government buildings. Consequently, many are part of the General Services Administration collection and have been transferred to the holdings of the Smithsonian American Art Museum and National Gallery of Art. His most famous work may be his reliefs in the interior of the Department of the Interior's Main Interior Building in Washington DC.

== Selected public artworks ==
- Birds and Animals of the Northwest (1937), eleven limestone reliefs, Fond du Lac, Wisconsin, post office
- Wild Ducks (1940), four aluminum panels for the post office in Janesville, Wisconsin, now at the newer Janesville post office building
- American Moose (1939), limestone relief – Main Interior Building, Washington DC
- American Bison (1939), limestone relief – Main Interior Building, Washington DC
- Cow and Calf (1943) black walnut relief sculpture for Macomb, Illinois Post Office, now in Smithsonian American Art Museum collection
- Chess Pavilion (1957), game boards, incised carvings, reliefs and freestanding sculptures for open-air structure in Chicago's Lincoln Park
