= Zygmund Sazevich =

American sculptor (1899–1968)

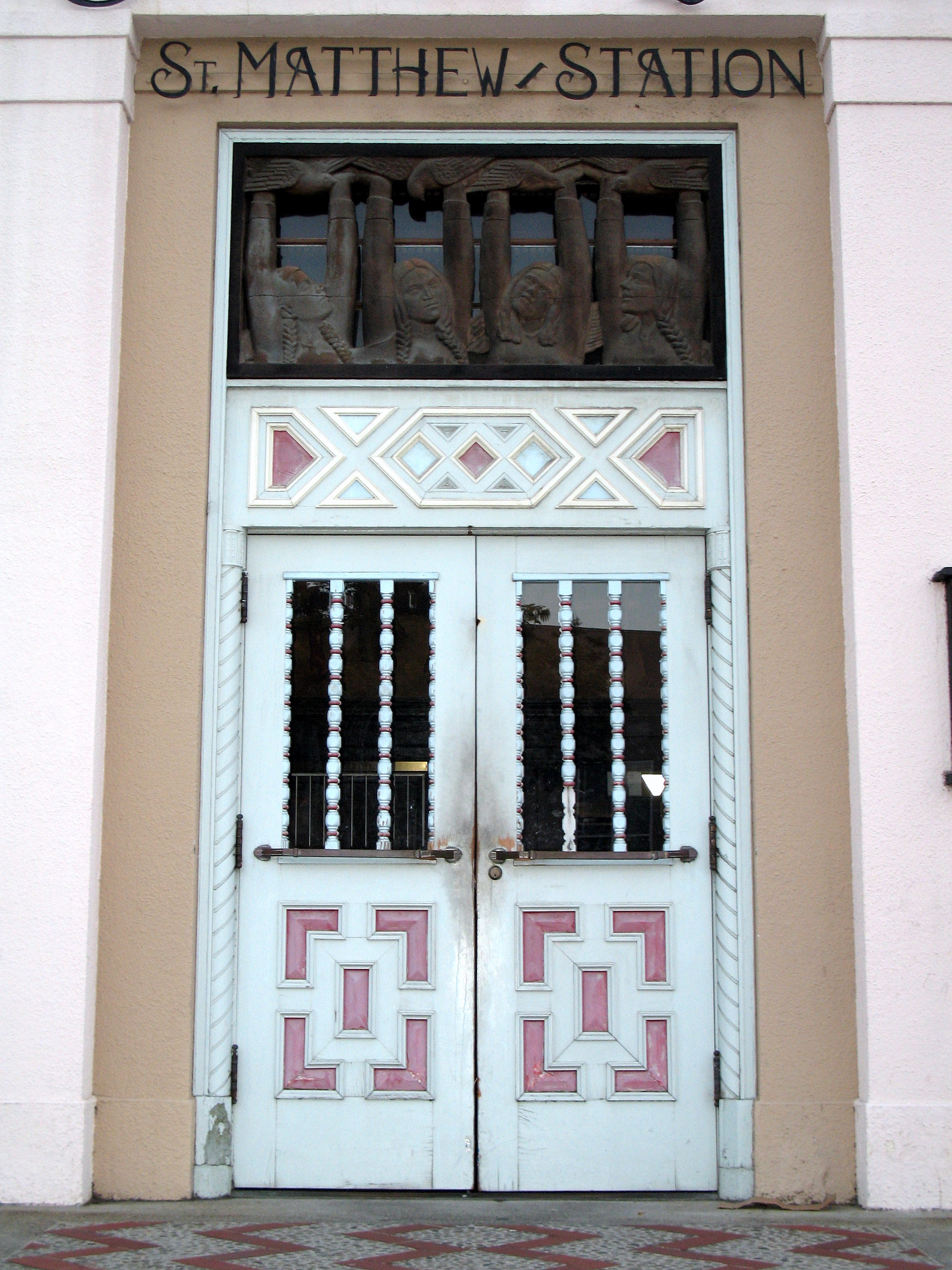
Relief sculpture at the entrance to the United States Post Office in San Mateo, California

Zygmund Sazevich (May 2, 1899, Kovno, Russia (now Kaunas, Lithuania) – 1968, San Francisco) was an American sculptor.

He studied at the University of Kazan. He immigrated to the San Francisco area in 1923. He studied art at University of California, Berkeley and the California School of Fine Arts. He taught at the California School of Fine Arts from 1947 to 1965, and at Mills College from 1947 to 1958.

He created sculpture for Post Offices in Roseville, California, San Mateo, California, and carved three wood bas reliefs for the post office in Kent, Washington. His bronze sculpture, Egrets, is at Los Altos, California.
