= Roy King (artist) =

American sculptor

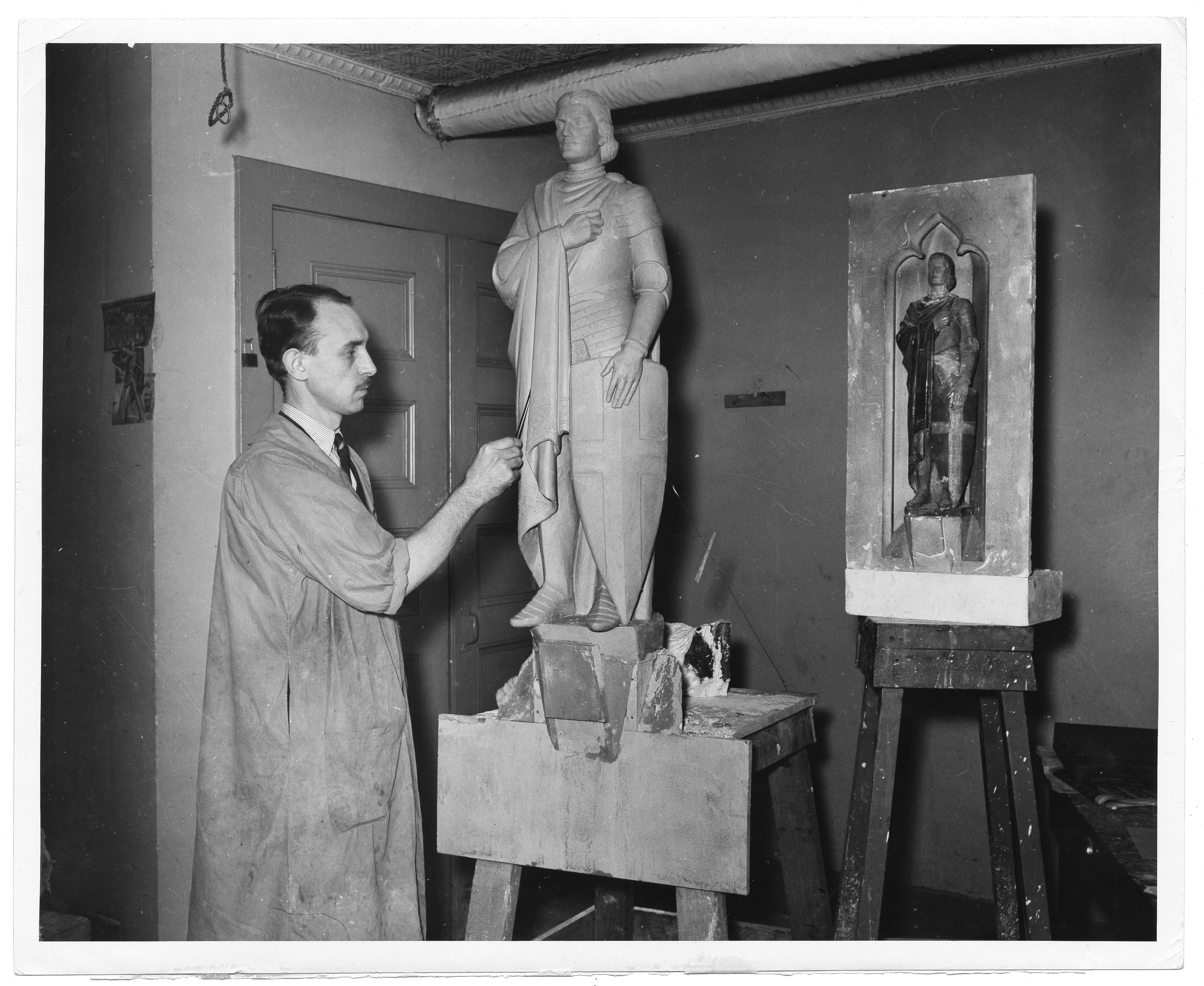
- King working on the sculpture, Honor, 1936
- Born: Roy Elwood King; November 22, 1903; Richmond, Virginia, United States
- Died: August 29, 1986 (aged 82); Hampton Beach, New Hampshire, United States
- Education: University of Richmond, Art Students League of New York, Beaux Arts Institute of Design
- Known for: Sculpture, painting, engineering

Roy Elwood King (November 22, 1903 – August 29, 1986) was an American born sculptor, painter and civil engineer.

== Early life ==
Roy E. King was born November 22, 1903, in Richmond, Virginia.

King attended the University of Richmond until 1924 when he transferred to the Ohio School of Commercial Art and the Cleveland School of Fine Arts for a year. Moving to New York he studied with the Art Students' League, where he learned anatomy from George Bridgman, and at the same time studied at the Beaux Arts Institute of Design from about 1925 to 1933. At Beaux Arts Institute of Design (BAID) Roy King studied drawing and sculpting from a number of fine artists, Lee Lawrie, C. Paul Jennewein, Ulric Ellerhusen, and Edward McCartan among others. Roy mastered their styles and form so perfectly that they relied upon him to accomplish many parts of their commissions.

== Selected works ==
1927 – Design and modeling the Lotus Shaft Fountain in the Los Angeles (Central) Public Library Children’s Court as commissioned by Lee Lawrie.

1927 – Design and modeling for Bertram Goodhue'sChrist Church Cranbrook, Bloomfield Hills, Michigan, and the University of Chicago Rockefeller Chapel, Chicago, Illinois as Assistant to Ulric Ellerhusen and Lee Lawrie, Designing Sculptors.

1929–1930 – Design and modeling buttress figures and decorative panels for Nebraska State Capitol, State Library of Pennsylvania Harrisburg Pennsylvania, bronze doors and gates at Pennsylvania State College, Cathedral of St. John the Divine, New York Central Portal and others as Assistant Sculptor to Lee Lawrie.

1931 – Design and modeling of friezes, tower grills and the corner figures on top of the tower with Art Deco design for the Louisiana State Capitol at Baton Rouge, Louisiana as Assistant to Ulric Ellerhusen.

1931 – Design and modeling of Bronze Sundial also known as the Tiffany Bench with the words "This garden given in memory of Katrina Ely Tiffany of the class of 1897" for Bryn Mawr College.

1932 – Design and modeling details and panels of the George Rogers Clark Memorial in George Rogers Clark National Historical Park at Vincennes, Indiana working with Joseph Kiselewski.

1933 – Design and modeling for panels in the United States Solicitor General's Office and Four Winds Reliefs for the Department of Justice Building assisting Sculptor C. Paul Jennewein.

1933 – Design, modeling and execution of a large frieze on the Columbus, Ohio Post Office with C. Paul Jennewein.

1934 – Enlarged Bryant Baker's 2 small models for the U.S. Senate Building to 8 foot size of Caesar Rodney (located in the Crypt) and the other of John Middleton Clayton (located in the Senate connecting corridor, 2nd floor).

1934 – Design, modeling and execution four panels of Characters in American Literature. The panels for the Library were of Evangeline, Tom Sawyer and Huckleberry Finn, Rip Van Winkle, and Hawkeye and an Indian Brave for Library of Grover Cleveland High School, Ridgewood, Long Island, New York.

1935 – Won the Public Works of Art Project design competition for the Cadet Mess, Washington Hall, West Point, New York. Designed, modeled, carved and installed figures of the Four Virtues of Military Service: Scholarship, Loyalty, Physical Vigor, and Military Leadership. Each statue is 13 feet tall, carved in limestone, with a combined weight of 16 tons.

1935 – Designed, modeled and carved a bust in Greek pentelic marble of General Alexander S. Webb of College of the City of New York for the school.

1937 – Won and completed a sculptural award from The U.S. Treasury Section of Painting and Sculpture to do a walnut wooden panel sculpture called “Pennsylvania Farming” for the Post Office 230 Market Street, Bloomsburg, Pennsylvania (see page 6).

1938 – Won and completed a sculptural award for his design of “Old Salt” or "The Sailor" which was displayed under the Norwegian flag in the Court of Nations and for his figure of "Aviation" at the entrance to Iceland Building. He designed, enlarged and mounted these 13’ figures for 1939 Worlds Fair in New York.

1939 – Designed, modeled and carved in collaboration with the architect, Vladimir Ossipoff the sculptural decoration, a symbolic representation of humanity, a figure appealing to medicine as symbolized by the caduceus, over the main entrance of the Medical Group building located in Honolulu, Hawaii on Punchbowl Street between Hotel and Beretania Streets.

1939-1940 Roy King’s “Horse and Rider”, very powerfully carved in 1939 in native Hawaiian monkey pod wood (or perhaps koa or Ohia). In 1940 it was awarded the first prize in sculpture by popular vote in the Honolulu Academy of Arts exhibition (HONOLULU ADVERTISER Friday, March 8, 1940). It depicts a native Hawaiian riding his horse along the water edge, an image which was once common in the Islands. Roy King created a first version of his Horse and Rider in 1932. In 1935, a plaster model of his Horse and Rider was exhibited at the Pennsylvania Academy of Fine Arts and in New York. This version Roy King designed and carved to be representative of a Hawaiian on horseback. The Collections Committee purchased Roy King's "Horse and Rider" in 2013 for the permanent collection of the Honolulu Museum of Art, 900 South Beretania, Honolulu, HI 96814. Theresa Papanikolas, Ph.D., Curator of European and American Art at the museum put it immediately on view in their Arts of Hawaii Gallery. It will be part of "Art Deco Hawaii" opening July (2014).

1939–1940 Awarded the commission from Charles William Dickey (1871–1942), the Architect, to do the carved interior doors and cast concrete exterior leaf decorations on the Mabel Smyth Building, renamed the Queen's Conference Center for The Queen's Medical Center.

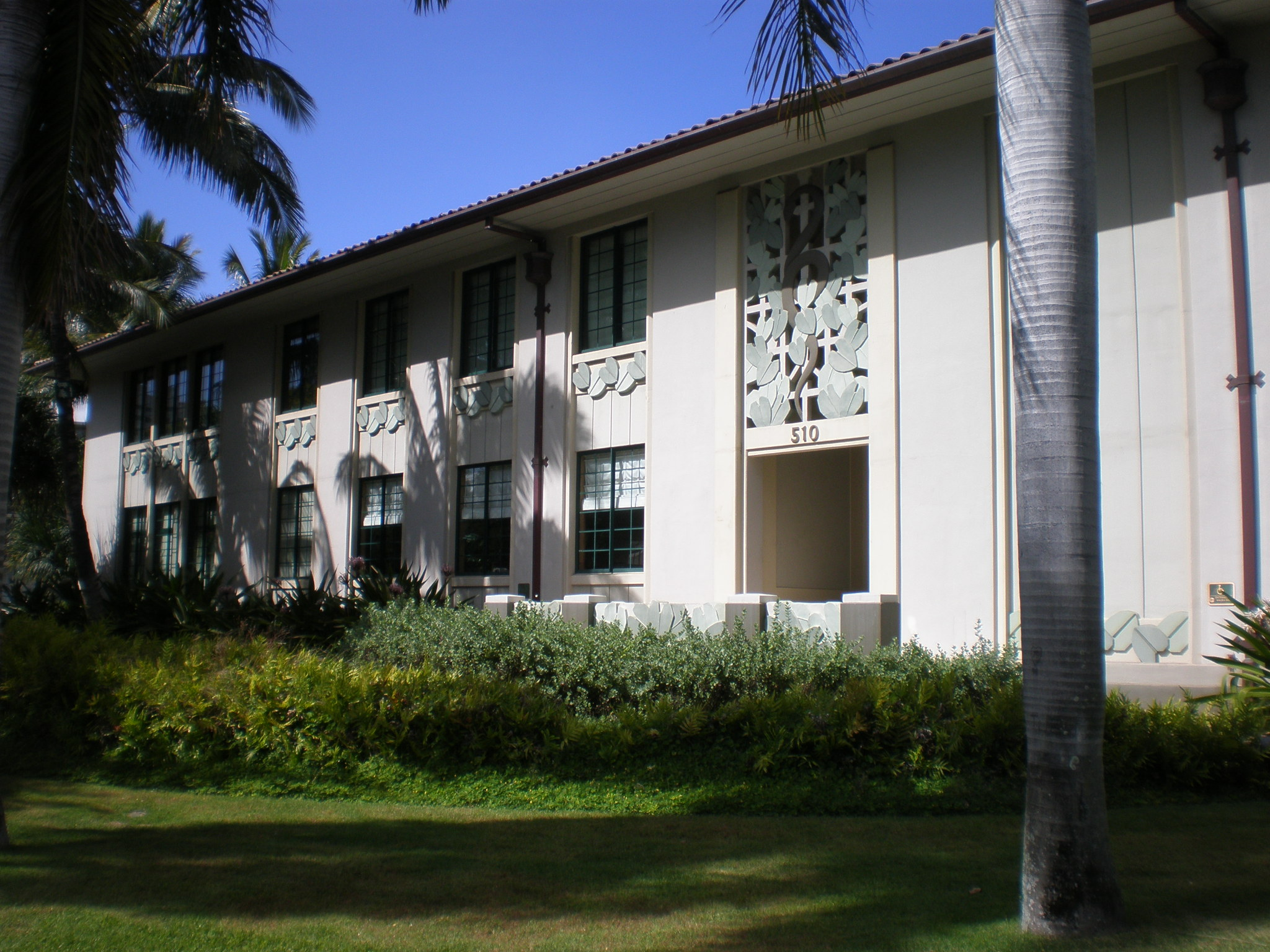
Roy E. King designed and executed the exterior cast concrete Ape leaf decorations on the Mabel Smyth Memorial Building, now Queen's Medical Center Conference Center, Honolulu, Hawaii

1940 – Designed, modeled and carved US Marine Emblem 3'x3' monkey pod wood for Camp Catlin Entrance, Pearl Harbor, Hawaii.

1941 – Designed, modeled and carved the seal over the entrance for Architect Val Ossipoff's Outrigger Canoe Club just below Diamond Head, Hawaii in Waikiki.

1942 – Won and completed a sculptural award from the U.S. Treasury Department Section of Painting and Sculpture (Fine Arts) competition to carve two figures in monkey pod wood located in the Post Office at Schofield Barracks, Oahu.

1942–1944 – Won the competition to create a War Memorial in Honolulu, Hawaii, honoring all 880 Americans of Hawaii who died in World War II. He designed, carved, cast and erected the structure, located on King Street at Punchbowl Street near the King Kamehameha Statue and across the street from Iolani Palace. “IN HONOR OF ALL AMERICANS OF HAWAII WHO DIED IN THIS WORLD WAR, THAT THE BEAUTY AND FREEDOM OF OUR LAND MIGHT BE PRESERVED FOR ALL HUMANITY.”

1945 – Awarded the commission from architect Charles William Dickey (1871–1942) to design, model and carve a second War Memorial, this time out of Vermont Danby Imperial white marble for Kalakaua Park in Hilo on the Island of Hawaiʻi. 10 feet long, 4 feet wide and 6 feet high, with 157 names of Big Island war dead inscribed on top, a lily pond reflects one side of the monument showing a central figure, a winged composite fighting man, representing all combat forces. He is the spirit of men who fight in order to live in peace. On either side of him are the people of the world living and working together in harmony. The back is inscribed with “That their spirit may guide us to an ever living peace among all mankind.”

1946 – Commissioned to design, model and carve local foliage and plants in the 12 capitals of the columns for the nave interior of Episcopal St. Andrew’s Cathedral, Queen Emma Square, Honolulu. Each is different and dedicated to a family of the church.

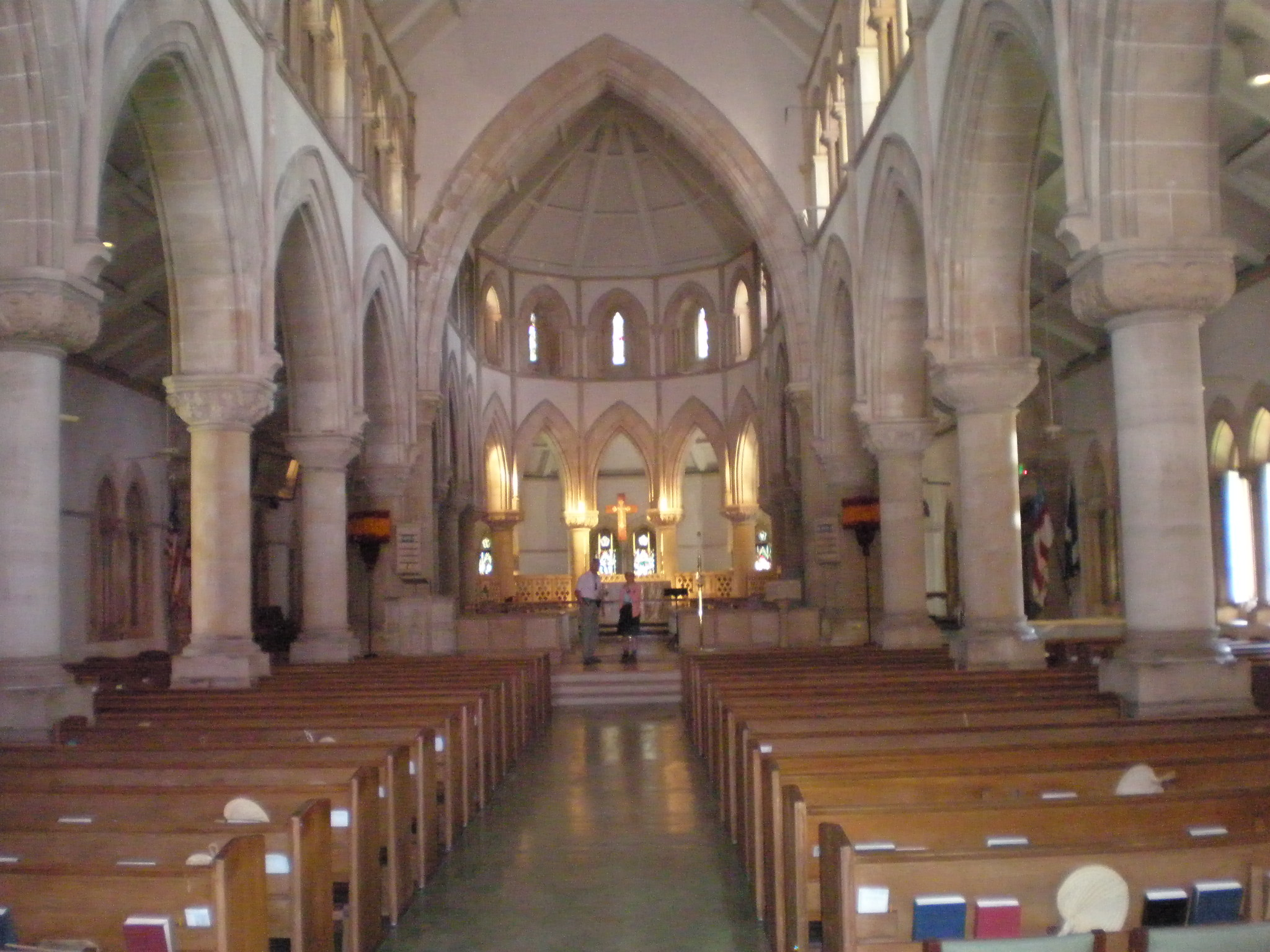
Roy E. King designed and carved the 12 unique capitals of the columns for the nave interior of Cathedral Church of Saint Andrew, Honolulu, Hawaii

1946 – Commissioned to design, model and carve candelabra and design, model and create a long series of cast-stone pot planters, produced in pairs, which graduated in size from about a foot high to an enormous pair about as tall as a man and weighing hundreds of pounds for the Catholic Cathedral in central Honolulu.

1947 – Commissioned to design, model and execute sculpture and decorations for McInerny's Ltd. Department Store located at Fort and King Streets in Honolulu. First, he carved out of native Koa wood a large, 8 foot by 10 foot, sculptural logo of the company, the "house-mark", for the exterior of the building. Second, he carved massive Hawaiian gods, Kū and Hina in existing lava rock 3'x3'x8' for the Men's department. Kū, the male element, the architect and builder of Hawaiian theology, and Hina, the female element, earth mother, were used in ancient ceremonies and worshipped in the temples. Located on the basement level of the building, these were the columns supporting the main floor beams.

1948 – Commissioned to design and model the bronze tablet monument at the top of the Pali on Oahu. Seen by millions as they gaze at the valley below it commemorates the Pali fiftieth anniversary of road constructed in 1897 and completed in 1898.

1949 – Commissioned to design, model and carve the marble sculpture of the territorial seal for the main entrance of the new territorial welfare building, Queen Liliʻuokalani Building. The figure on the left represents an ancient Hawaiian king and the figure on the right American patriotism. The motto “Ua Mau Ke Eao Kaaina Ika Pono” “The life of the land is preserved in righteousness” in Honolulu, Hawaii.

1951 – Commissioned to design, model and cast stone grilles for the multistoried Y. M. C. A. Building in Waikiki at 404 Atkinson Drive, Hawaii.

1952 – Commissioned to design, model and carve wood and stone Hawaiian gods, Kū and Hina, for the exterior and for the interior wood table lamps and introduce the use of local sandstone facings for the façade of the McInerny's Waikiki store.

== Later career ==
Even while working with the major sculptors of the 1920s and early 1930s he established himself as a sculptor in his own right. He performed many small commissions, such as busts and figures for various Federal projects. By 1935 his work was independent of his earlier teachers. He married in 1935 and still made his home in New York City.

1938 – after finishing projects for the World’s Fair he and his wife, Nora, moved to Hawaii. Besides his monumental works he did there he did many small works, became popular in the local exhibits and active in the Honolulu of Artists' Association.

1942–1953 – Taught figure drawing and sculpture at the University of Hawaii, Extension Division.

1949 – Roy was chosen to be President of the Honolulu Artists’ Association.

1941–1946 and 1950–1971 – Civil Engineer – With the bombing of Pearl Harbor in 1941 Hawaiian residents had to have essential jobs. Roy worked his way up to becoming a Senior Civil Engineer with the Navy. He left in 1946, but returned in 1950 to Pearl Harbor as an Administrative Construction Engineer, and stayed with the Federal Government until he retired after a 30-year career.

Leaving Hawaii in 1956 his positions with the Government took him first to California, then Texas, and finally New Hampshire. His last work was with General Services Administration in Boston as Construction Management Engineer with projects of million dollar post offices and federal buildings.

King worked on many commissions and exhibited his art until his death at home in Hampton Beach, New Hampshire August 29, 1986

King was a member of the National Sculpture Society.

== Exhibits ==
1929 – Knoedler Gallery, New York

1931 – Municipal Exhibition of Radio City Music Hall

1932 – Richmond Academy of Art, VA

1933 – and other dates – National Sculpture Society

1935 – Pennsylvania Academy of the Fine Arts

1935 – American Architectural Society

1939 – and other dates – Honolulu Museum of Art

1960 – "Venus", a standing nude carved in Austin stone, was shown in the Dallas Museum of Art show and traveling exhibition throughout Texas for all of 1960.

1960 – A portrait head of Paul King, Roy had sculpted of his son in California, won the Esther Tyrrell Garth Memorial Award which placed the head in the permanent collection of the Beaumont Art Museum in Beaumont, Texas.

1962 – Corning Glass Company, NY exhibit

1964-1965 – Doll and Richards Gallery, Boston, MA

2009 and continuing – Smithsonian American Art Museum, Inventories of American Painting and Sculpture

The Art Museum of Southeast Texas (Beaumont, Texas), the Honolulu Museum of Art, and the Smithsonian American Art Museum are among the public collections holding sculptures by Roy King.
