= St. Albans Post Office =

- U.S. National Register of Historic Places
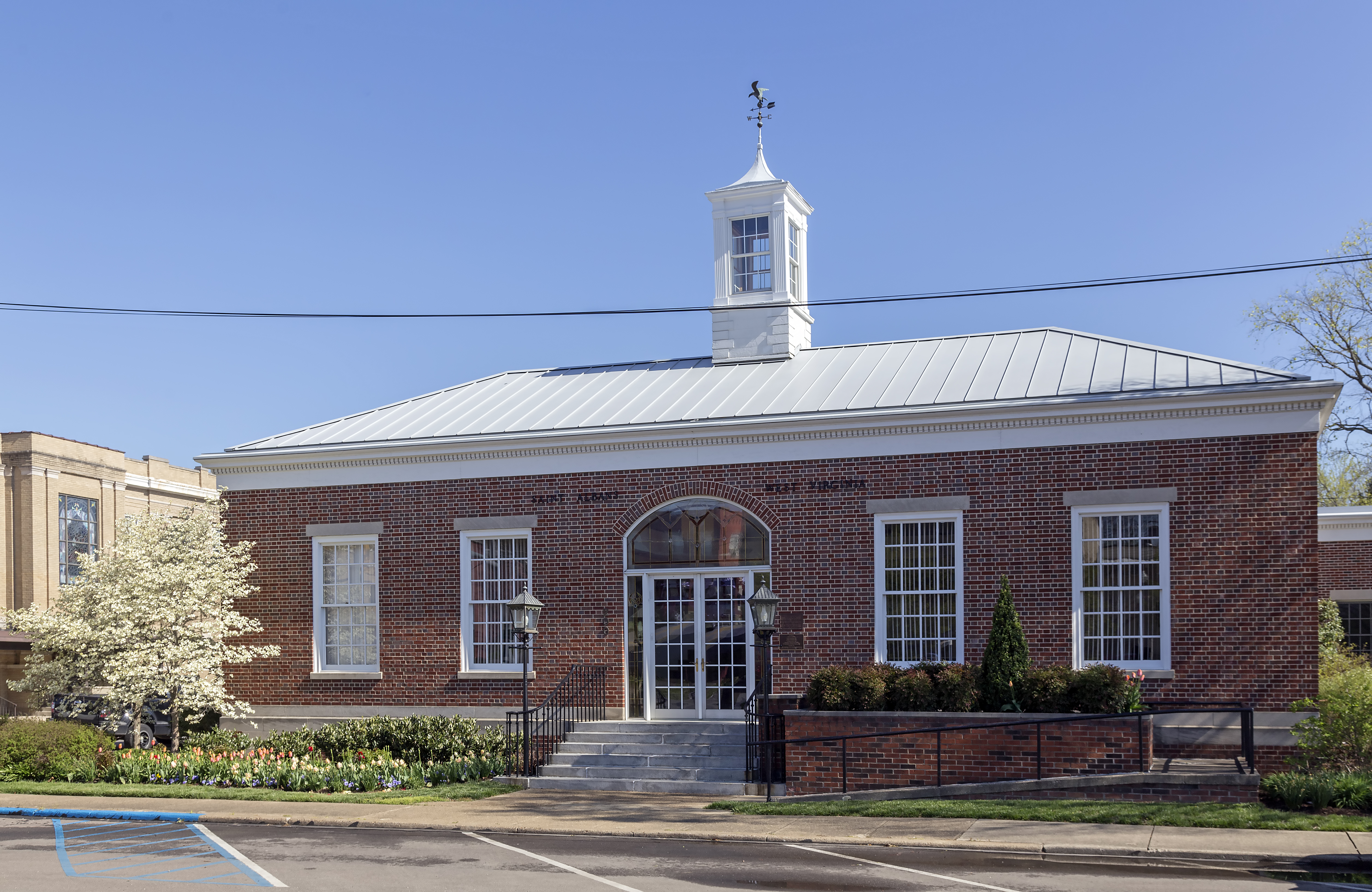
- St. Albans Post Office in 2016

- Location within West Virginia Location within the United States
- Location: 202 Sixth Ave., St. Albans, West Virginia
- Coordinates: 38°23′11″N 81°50′9″W
- Area: less than one acre
- Built: 1937
- Architect: Louis A. Simon
- Engineer: Neal A. Melick
- Architectural style: Colonial Revival
- NRHP reference No.: 94001285
- Added to NRHP: November 4, 1994

The Old St. Albans Post Office is a historic post office building located at 202 Sixth Ave. in St. Albans, Kanawha County, West Virginia. It was built in 1937, and is a one-story, five bay brick building with a metal hip roof in Colonial Revival style. A rear addition was built about 1955. It was designed by the Office of the Supervising Architect under Louis A. Simon and Supervising Engineer Neal A. Melick.

It was listed on the National Register of Historic Places as St. Albans Post Office in 1994.

== See also ==
- List of United States post offices
