= Enid Bell =

American sculptor, illustrator and teacher

Enid Bell Palanchian
- Born: December 4th 1904; London, England
- Died: 1994; Englewood, New Jersey, United States
- Occupations: Sculptor, Illustrator, Teacher

Enid Bell Palanchian (December 4, 1904 – 1994), known professionally as Enid Bell in her early career and later on as Enid Bell Palanchian, was an American sculptor, illustrator and teacher born in London, England.

== Early and personal life ==
Bell was born in England in 1904 to Scottish parents and began her studies at the Glasgow School of Art, then at the St John's Wood Art School as well as studying with fellow Scot Sir William Reid Dick in London. Then after moving to the United States at the age of seventeen at the Art Students League in New York City. Essentially a figurative, direct carving in wood artist, she was based in New Jersey where she became the head of the sculpture program of the Federal Art Project for that state and was herself the creator of several FAP commissions.

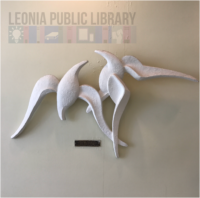
This is Bell - Palanchian's sculpture "Birds" that was donated to the Leonia Public Library that was donated in 1979.

In 1932 she married Armenian-American businessman and painter, Missak Palanchian, though she retained her surname as Bell for professional purposes. They would often showcase their art together in exhibits across New Jersey, New York, and New Mexico.

She taught at Miss Chaplin's School of Arts in New York City from 1929 to 1931 under the role of an art teacher. In 1940 until 1941 she was the Sculpture Supervisor for the New Jersey Arts & Crafts Project, W.P.A.

Following the end of the Federal Art Project in 1944, she taught as instructor of sculpture and Head of the Sculpture Department of the Newark School of Fine and Industrial Art until 1968.

Bell-Palanchian donated her sculpture "Little Indian Dancer" to the Englewood Public Library Children's Room in 1981. Furthermore, she also donated her sculpture "Birds" to the Leonia Public Library where it is hanging on the rear wall of the stairs.

Bell was a member of the National Sculpture Society.

Bell died in 1994 in Englewood, New Jersey.

== Art style ==
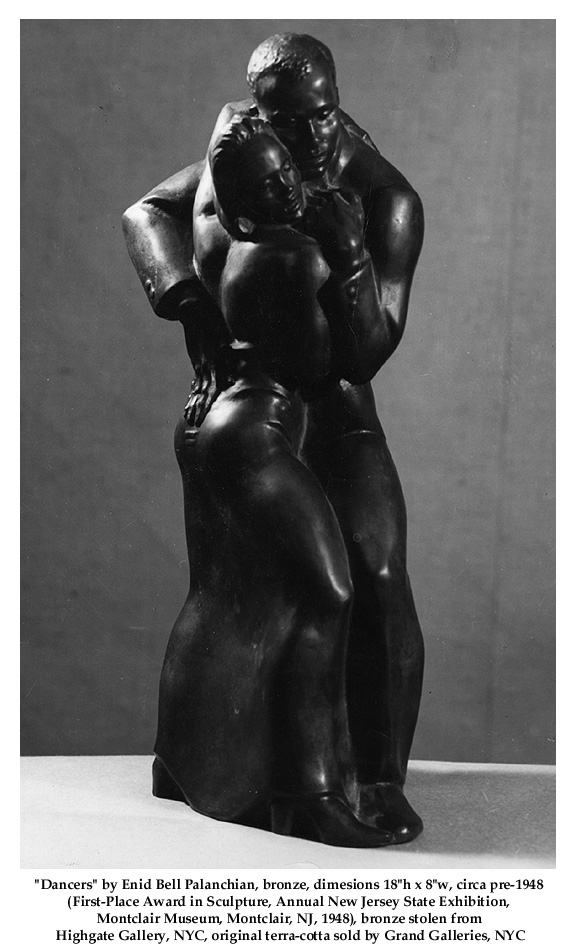
This sculpture entitled "Dancers" was created by Enid Bell Palanchian in the 1940s.

Bell's art style can be described as "growing". Nearly all of her sculptures are made from wood and a few that were made from ceramics. As it was described, her larger sculptures tend to "grow" from the ground and expand and widens as the sculpture builds up. Many of her sculptures that feature two people tend to be shown in so0me sort of embrace. Her sculpture "Dancers" which is made from plaster shows a man and a woman who is standing in front of the man in some sort of dance with a skirt in her left hand and her head tilted back towards the man. This piece was created in 1926, when Bell was about 22 years old, but the piece was unfortunately destroyed. She tended to create sculptures that were "twined" around one another, meaning that were wrapped up in one another as is in shown in her bronze sculpture entitled "Dancers" that was created in the 1940s.

She took inspiration from the material (different types of wood, plaster, ceramic, and bronze) including its natural form as well as nature and geometric patterns in the world around her. Her theme in the creation of her art is seemingly growth, not only in the style of having larger more expanded base and then funneling up towards the top. Furthermore, a large part of her art includes bodies that are intertwined with one another that suggest connection. Her art has been connected to earlier movements such as the art deco movement that got started in the 1910s and gained momentum in the 1920s and 1930s. As this time period would have been the time where Palanchian would have started her education in the arts and have begun to have gotten exposure, seeing these art deco elements in her own art is unsurprising.

== Exhibitions ==
=== Solo exhibitions ===
- Ferargil Galleries, New York City, December 9 – 29, 1929, exhibited 22 pieces including hazel wood “Pause”, Madonna”, “Trio” cherrywood “Duet” & “Harvesters”, bronze “Pavlova”, “Summer” & “Liza”, white oak “Negress”, whitewood “Negresses” & “Mexicans” and portrait panels and screens.
- Arden Gallery, New York City, NY, November 5–19, 1934, exhibited 26 pieces including metal panels “Oriental Dancers”, “Flute Player” and unnamed “Two Figures”, a mahogany screen, ebony “Africans”, “Negress” & “Nocturne”, marble “Seated Figure”, “Sleep” & “Pigeons”, white pine “Mother and Child”, mahogany “Dancer”, Japanese wood “Cyclamen”, several carved chests, hazelwood “At the Window” and cherry wood “Harvesters” & “Composition”.
- New Jersey Arts & Crafts Project, Works Project Administration, “Exhibition of Sculpture & Drawings by Enid Bell”, 1940
- Southern Connecticut State College, “Exhibition”, 1966
- North Jersey Cultural Council, “Exhibition”, May 1969
- Museum of Santa Fe, Santa Fe, New Mexico
- Illinois State Museum, Springfield, Illinois, February 15 to April 15, 1957, Exhibited twenty sculptures including “Bathers”, “Clown”, and pieces of ballplayers and musicians.

=== Joint Exhibitions With Missak Palanchian ===
- Kresge Gallery, Newark, NJ, 1934
- Museum of Santa Fe, Santa Fe, New Mexico, 1948
- Museum of New Mexico Art, Santa Fe, New Mexico, 1950
- Harwood Gallery, Taos, New Mexico
- Argent Gallery, New York City, New York, March 1949, Exhibited 24 pieces including, ebony “Dark Continent” and “Africans”, white marble “Embrace” & “Madonna”, terra-cotta “Odalisque” & “Clown”, pine “Sisters”, “Spirella”, “Baseball” & “Mother and Child” bronze “Dancers”, mahogany “Musician”, ”Boy”, “Orientale” & “Undula”, and pear wood “Bathers”.
- Silo Gallery, Morris Plains, NJ, March 1954, exhibited pieces including ebony “Dark Continent”

=== Annual, Special, and Group Exhibitions ===
Europe

- Paris International Exposition, Paris, France, 1937- Winner of the Gold Medal Award

New York

- Metropolitan Museum of Art, “Artists for Victory - An Exhibition of Contemporary American Art”
- New York's First World Fair, “American Art Today”, 1939, exhibited marble “Mother and Child”
- Museum of the City of New York, “National Exhibition of American Art”, Summer 1938, Exhibited “Mother and Child”
- New York Society of Craftsmen, “44th Annual Exhibition”, March 19 – 29th, 1947
- Argent Gallery, New York City, NY, “Contemporary American Crafts”, March 27 through April 6, 1946
- Ferargil Galleries, New York City, “Exhibition”, Spring 1930, exhibited “Negress” and “Pavlova”
- Brooklyn Museum, “Recent Works by Distinguished Sculptors”, 1930, exhibited cherry wood “Duet”, walnut “Autumn” and white wood “Negress”
- Whitney Studio Club, New York City, 1930
- Chappaqua Gallery, “Exhibit of Painting, Graphics and Sculptures”, September 28 to October, 1951
- Leslie Fliegel Gallery, “8 Contemporary Artists”, December 8, 1963 to January 12, 1964.

New Jersey

- New Jersey State Museum, Trenton, NJ
  - “Nature in Sculpture”, December 10, 1957 to February 2, 1958
  - “Art from New Jersey Colleges Exhibition”, January 8 to February 6, 1966, Enid Bell representing the Newark School of Fine and Industrial Arts, exhibited her white wood piece “Young Indian”
- The Jersey City Museum:
  - “The Nellie Wright Allen Exhibition”, November 3 – 29th, 1947, Exhibited “Undula”
  - “The Nellie Wright Allen Exhibition”, 1948, exhibited “Clown” and “Embrace”
  - “20th Annual National Exhibition”, February 20 to March 18, 1961, exhibited “Seated Figure”
- Fifty-Sixth Street Galleries, Exhibition in Plainfield, NJ, February 1930, exhibited a panel of her sister, Jean Diack, to which the Art Digest gave honorable mention.
- Ringwood Gallery, NJ, “Exhibition of Sculptures”, July 7 – 22nd, 1973
- Rutgers University, Douglas College, “Mary H. Dana Women Artists Series”, January 11 to February 19, 1988, exhibited 16 pieces, including Maplewood “Diver”, and “Mother and Child” and “Sisters”.
- Trenton Museum, ”New Deal Art”
- Montclair Art Museum, NJ:
  - “New Jersey State Exhibition”, November 12 to December 24, 1948, Exhibited terra-cotta “Dancers”, Received First Sculpture Award
  - “21st Annual New Jersey State Exhibition”, November _ to December 2, 1951, the awards jury withheld the top award in sculpture because of an exhibition rule that no artists may take the same prize within a five year period. Awarded “Honorable Mention” for her white marble “Madonna” because she had received the first prize award less than 5 years previously.
  - “The Awards Artists Exhibition”, March 1966, exhibited pieces including “Bird Bath”
- The Newark School of Fine and Industrial Art:
  - “Annual Exhibition”, demonstration by Enid Bell, February 20, 1947
  - “Annual Exhibition”, demonstration by Enid Bell, May 19, 1948
  - “Annual Exhibition”, demonstration by Enid Bell, May 17, 1949
  - Solo Exhibit January 22 to February 2, ?, Exhibited “Bathers”, Composition”, “African”, “Mother and Child”, Grief”, “Night”, “Pieta”, Pigeons”, Pavlova”, “Night Club”, “Whitewood Screen”, “Dancers”, “Negress”, “Musicians”, and “Hazelwood Panel”.
  - “Annual Exhibition”, demonstration in clay by Enid Bell, May 1964
- Newark Public Library, “A History of Crafts”, Summer 1968
- The Newark Art Club, “American Art Week Exhibition”, October 30 to November 20, 1947, Exhibited “Pony Rider” and “Mother and Child”
- Associated Artists of New Jersey:
  - “Third New York Exhibition” at the Riverside Museum, March 2 – 23rd, 1947, Exhibited “Clown”, “Sisters”, “Bathers” and “Refugees”;
  - “Exhibition” at Summit Art Association, April 25 to May 9, 1948, Exhibited “Boy Reading”, “Surf Rider” and “Spanish Mother”
  - “Exhibition” at the Newark Museum, March 26 to April 24, 1949, Exhibited terra-cotta “Indian Mother”
  - “Work by New Jersey Artists”, March 25 to April 30, 1952
  - “Exhibition” at the Newark Public Library, November 1953
  - “Seventh New York Exhibition”, November 6 – 24, 1954, exhibited mahogany “Tackle” and “Violinist”
  - “Newark Arts Festival”, June 1 – 7, 1959, exhibited “Odalisque”
- Leonia Public Library, NJ
  - “Exhibition”, May 1977, exhibited 20 pieces
  - “Sculptures and Craft Illustrations”, March 1983, exhibited pieces included mahogany relief “Madonna”

Pennsylvania

- The Pennsylvania Academy of the Fine Arts:
  - “Annual Exhibition of Painting and Sculpture”, January 28 to March 3, 1940, exhibited “Mother and Child”
  - “Annual Exhibition of Painting and Sculpture”, January 26 to March 3, 1946, Exhibited “Sisters”, January 26 to March 2, 1947, Exhibited “Dark Continent”

Florida

- Miami Beach Art Center, “Exhibition” March _ to April 5, 1949, Exhibited 6 pieces including pearwood “Bathers”

New Mexico

- New Mexico State Fair, 1949

Kansas

- Wichita Art Association, “Decorative Arts – Ceramic Exhibition”, May 4–11, 1946, Exhibited ceramic pieces, “Angel”, “Girl Reading” and “Bathers”

Georgia

- Columbus Museum, “Exhibition”, October 1956, exhibited pieces including terra-cotta “Grief” and mahogany “Violinist”

Illinois

- Illinois Museum, “Art Gallery Exhibit”, February 15 to April 15, 1957, exhibited pieces including “Bathers”, “Baseball”, “Musicians”, and “Clown”

National

- National Academy of Design, unknown year
- National Sculpture Society:
  - “An Exhibition of Sculpture”, May 14 to June 20, 1952, Exhibited “Embrace” and “Clown”
  - “Sculpture Exhibition 1961”, April 4 – 21, 1961, exhibited “Native”
  - “16th Annual Exhibition”, May 1969, Exhibited “At the Window” which won a special honorable mention
- Architectural League, unknown year
- Dance International, unknown year
- Audubon Artists, 1945

== Published Reviews of Bell - Palanchian's Work ==
- 1930 - "Done in Wood" Park Avenue Review
  - "Enid Bell, whose carvings in wood are to be shown at Ferargil Galleries during October, jumps agiley from prim flowerpiece and delicate portrait relief to her superbly vital "harmonica Player" -- the epitome of negro line and temperament. Who would think out of Scotland, land of decorum and calm living would come a young artist who could so thoroughly capture the very spirit of our "mad rhythms"!
- 1933 - "Women Who Won" Newark Ledger by Agnes Fahy
  - "Adaptability is an indispensable attribute of the artist. Specialization too often spells death for him.' Enid Bell, the attractive young sculptor who has recently come to Newark and is living at...was surrounded by evidence of her own adaptability as she talked of art, artists, and their training. The conversation took place in the Contemporary Gallery of the Kresge's Department Store where last week an exhibition of her sculpture and of the paintings of her husband Missak Palanchian was held. There were figures in bronze, plaster, and terra cotta, plaques, screens and bas-reliefs carved from wood and her remarks revealed that she also paints in oil, etches, has done mural decorations, magazine illustrating, and so on. 'An artist must have a variety of experience at his hand, ' she said 'Think of the mediums used by the great masters such as Leonardo Da Vinci and Michelangelo who could carve, paint, design a cathedral but to mention a few of the things they did.' Specialization may be all right in time, but the artists should first have a comprehensive knowledge of the whole field of art. There is danger too, in specialization in that the artist may lose his creative sense and become merely a mechanical producer. For another thing, there is the eternal practical side of the question. The artist's market is small enough at best. If he cannot sell his paintings, he should be able to turn his hand to something else. It was Miss Bell who last week was awarded first prize at the third annual state exhibition at the Montclair Art Museum for a wood carving called "Composition". Wherever displayed her wood carvings are displayed have attracted special attention. There is something exceedingly charming about her about the half figures which rise out of a flat background under her skilled hand. The finished sculpture is a work of art that really looks as if it had been created to give pleasure..."

== Awards ==
- Sculpture Medal, Newark Art Club, Newark, NJ, 1933
- Gold Medal, Paris International Exposition, Paris, France, 1937
- First Honor for Wood Sculpture, New Mexico State Fair, Santa Fe, New Mexico, 1941
- Second Honor for Ceramics, New Mexico State Fair, Santa Fe, New Mexico, 1941
- Honorary Membership of the Eugene Field Society National Association of Authors and Journalists, awarded March 19, 1941
- First-Place Award in Sculpture, Annual New Jersey State Exhibition, Montclair Museum, Montclair, NJ, 1948
- Nellie Wright Allen Award, Jersey City Museum Exposition

== Work ==
Enid Bell

- Birds, Leonia Public Library, Leonia, New Jersey (installed 1981)
- untitled, Boonton Post Office, Boonton, New Jersey, (1938)
- Boonton Post Office, Boonton, New Jersey
- Children Reading, Union City Public Library, Union City, New Jersey (circa 1936-1939)
- Colonizing America, Center for Youth Education, Newark, New Jersey (1934)
- First Sisters Arriving at Port of Newark, Wooden Panel (1937)
- Little Indian Dancer, Englewood Public Library, Englewood, New Jersey
- Alexander Hamilton, Troy Public Library, Troy, New York
- bird bath, Music, Science, Union City Library, Union City, New Jersey
- The Post Office 1790, United States Post Office, Mt. Holly, New Jersey (1937)
- On the Range, Deaf Smith County Museum, Hereford, Texas (1941)
- On the Range, Smithsonian American Art Museum (1941)
- Untitled Sculptural Frieze, Heckscher Museum of Art, Huntington, New York
- Tackle, Private collection, 1950
- 5 Arts and Crafts "Filmstrips" Series, published by Encyclopædia Britannica, 1954
- "Tin Craft as a Hobby", Harper Brother Publishers, 1934, favorably reviewed by the World Telegram and N.Y. Times in 1934
- "Practical Woodcarving Projects", Harper Brothers Publishers, 1940
- "Signs and Symbols in Christian Art", Oxford University Press (Illustrator only)
- "Christian Symbols in Italian Art", MacMillan Publishers (Illustrator only)
- "Forsaking All Others", Alice Duer Miller, Simon and Schuster Publishers, 1931, illustrations only, drawings of N.Y. scenes
- Various Articles in National Sculpture Review
- Various Articles in American Artist Magazine, including March 1965, "My Wood Sculpture" & June 1968, "Sculptors Hartwig & Glinsky"
