= Peace and Harvest =

- U.S. National Register of Historic Places
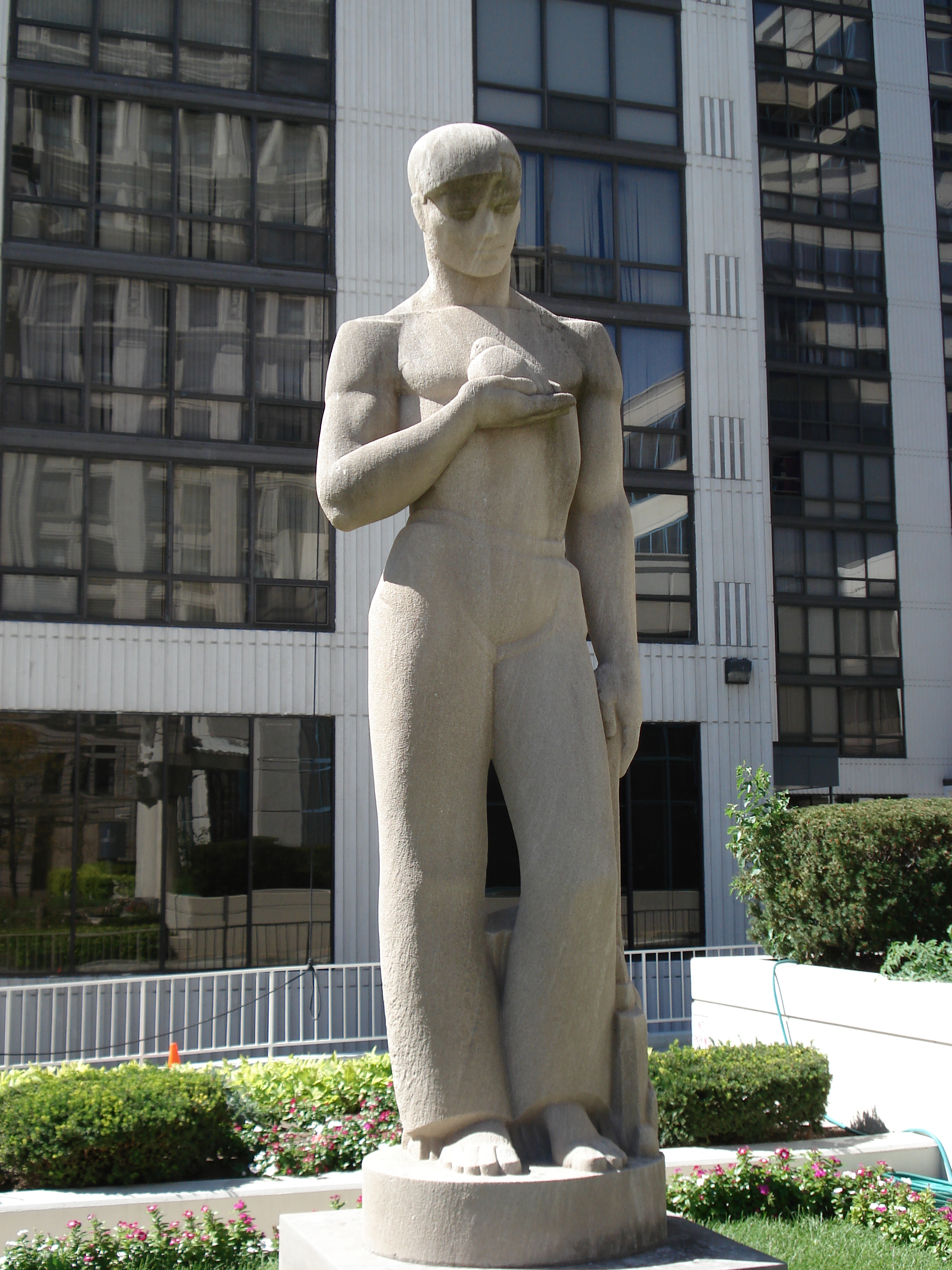
- Peace

- Location within Illinois Location within the United States
- Location: Jefferson and Hamilton Sts., Peoria, Illinois
- Coordinates: 40°41′34″N 89°35′27″W
- Area: less than one acre
- Built: 1939
- Architect: Mary Andersen Clark
- Architectural style: Depression Modern
- NRHP reference No.: 87002527
- Added to NRHP: February 16, 1994

Peace and Harvest are two 8-foot (2.4 m) tall limestone statues in downtown Peoria, Illinois, United States. The male and female figures represent peace and harvest respectively. The statues were sculpted by Chicagoan Mary Andersen Clark (born in 1910 and formerly of Peoria) as part of the Works Progress Administration's Federal Art Project, and were added to the National Register of Historic Places in 1988.

The statues, created in 1938 and 1939, were dedicated on September 3, 1939, in front of the Peoria Municipal Tuberculosis Sanitarium, just north of the current Forest Park Nature Center, and stood at the site until the sanitarium closed in 1975. They then moved to Peoria Courthouse Plaza from 1975 to 1988, then were stored in a Peoria firehouse until 1992, causing them to briefly lose their National Register status. In June 1992, the statues were placed at their current site in front of the Becker Building at the corner of Jefferson and Main Streets.
