= George Kratina =

American sculptor

- Born: February 13, 1910; Brooklyn, New York, United States
- Died: February 28, 1995 (aged 85); Chatham, New York, United States
- Occupation: Sculptor

George Kratina (February 13, 1910 – February 28, 1995) was an American sculptor. His work was part of the sculpture event in the art competition at the 1932 Summer Olympics.
