= Nena de Brennecke =

Argentine sculptor and mural painter

Nena de Brennecke (born 1883) was an Argentine sculptor and mural painter known for her WPA commissions for post offices.

== Early life and education ==
Born in Argentina, she studied at the Slade School of Fine Art in London and with Henri Matisse in France. She married Dr. Ernest Brennecke in London, they moved to Poughkeepsie, New York, United States where they divorced seven years later.

== Career ==
De Brennecke worked extensively on the Board of Directors Room at the Colorado Business Bank located in downtown Denver. She created bronze entrance doors decorated with Native American dancers, designed elevator doors, and created a sculpture. She created facade sculpture of the Motor Bus Terminal in Denver now demolished. She did exterior terracotta and bronze reliefts for the Railway Savings Bank in Pueblo, Colorado. De Brennecke was a founding member of the Denver Artists Guild in 1928.

In the 1930s de Brennecke relocated to Brooklyn, where the WPA commissioned her to do decorate post offices with carved wood reliefs.

=== Post office work ===
- Racoon, Deer, and Fox (now lost), 1939, Coraopolis, Pennsylvania
- Oil Refining, 1940, Paulsboro, New Jersey
- Dewberries, Drilling and Peaches, 1942, Hamlet, North Carolina:
- Stringing, Transplanting, and Harvesting, 1943, Windsor, Connecticut

=== Dewberries, Drilling and Peaches, Hamlet North Carolina Post Office ===
De Brennecke did three mahogany carvings entitled Dewberries, Drilling and Peaches at the Hamlet post office. She was paid $750 for her work. The works focus on Hamlet's role as an agricultural trade point and depict important trade goods and processes. The murals depict only men conducting the picking and drilling, despite the fact that women often did much of this work. De Brennecke was working within the conventions of manliness proscribed by the WPA.

== Exhibitions ==
- Paris Salon 1914
- Denver Art Museum 1928
- Renaissance Society, University of Chicago 1931
- Brooklyn Museum 1935

== Collections ==
- Brooklyn Museum, New York
- Smithsonian American Art Museum
- Denver Public Library West Art Collection
