= Las Animas Post Office =

- U.S. National Register of Historic Places
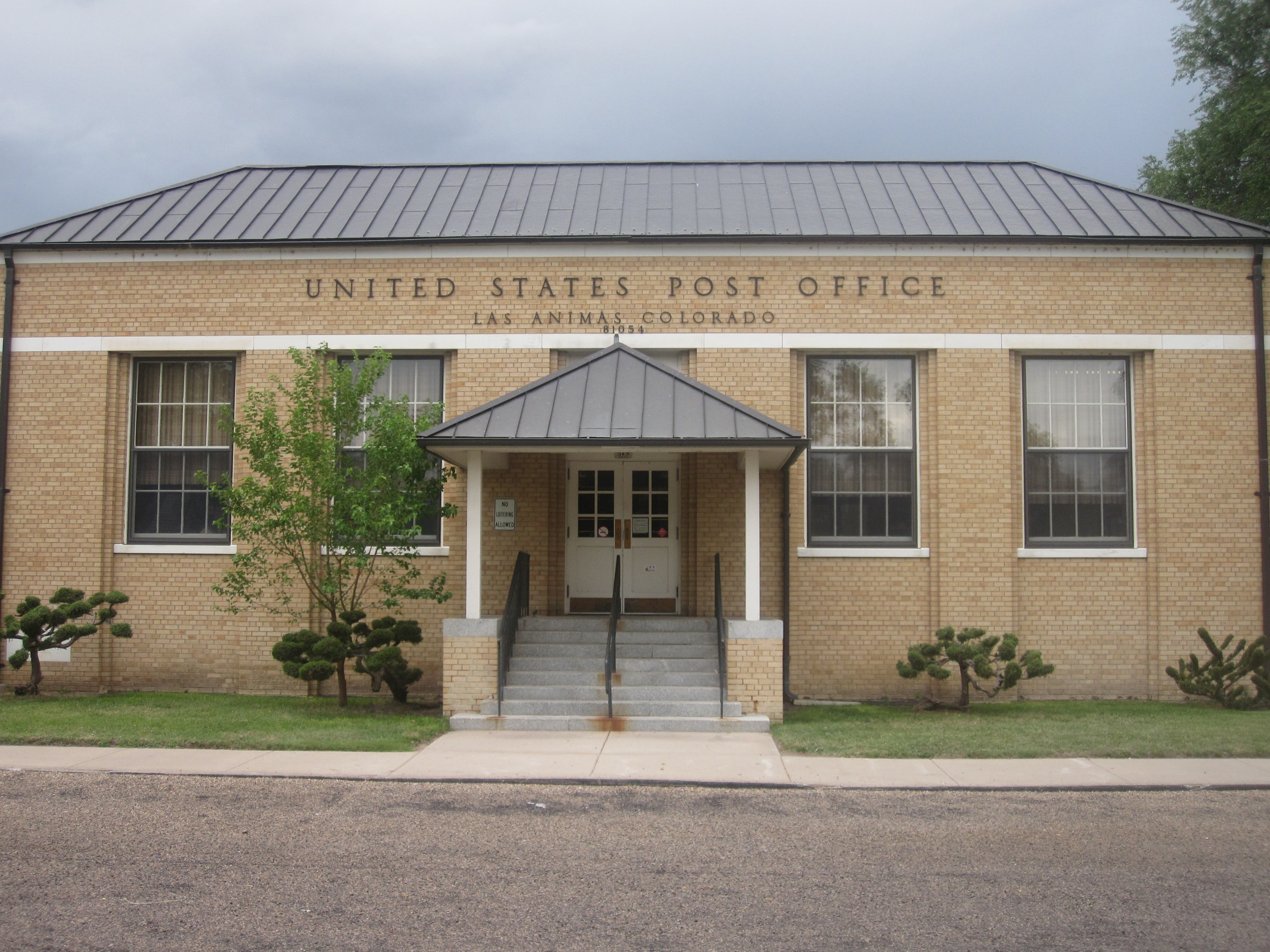
- Las Animas Post Office in July 2010

- Location within Colorado Location within the United States
- Location: 513 6th St., Las Animas, Colorado
- Coordinates: 38.0662°N 103.2230°W
- Area: less than one acre
- Built: 1937-38
- Built by: U.S. Treasury Dept.
- Architectural style: Modern Movement
- MPS: New Deal Resources on Colorado's Eastern Plains MPS
- NRHP reference No.: 07001392
- Added to NRHP: January 16, 2008

The Las Animas Post Office is a historic Modern Movement-style building in Las Animas, Colorado that was built during 1937–38. It was listed on the National Register of Historic Places in 2008.

It is a 60-by-60-foot (18 m × 18 m) building. It was unusual for New Deal-era construction in Colorado as it was built as "a direct relief project of the Treasury Department", rather than through the Works Progress Administration or another New Deal construction agency. It was the first Federal building in Las Animas and has served continuously as its post office.

== See also ==
- List of United States post offices
