= Alexander Sambugnac =

American sculptor

Love and Hope (1938), relief sculpture at the David W. Dyer Federal Building and Courthouse, Miami, Florida

Wisdom and Courage (1938), relief sculpture at the David W. Dyer Federal Building and Courthouse

Alexander Sambugnac was a Yugoslav-American artist and sculptor. He was born April 22, 1888, in Zimony, Kingdom of Hungary (today Zemun, Serbia). He studied at the Royal Academy of Fine Arts in Budapest, Hungary and Munich, Germany where he studied under Franz von Stuck. In 1913, he went to Paris and studied with Antoine Bourdelle. His sculptures were commission for U.S. Post Offices for a Great Depression era program overseen by the U.S. Treasury Department. His work is also at the Museum of Fine Arts in Budapest, at a cathedral in Vienna, Austria and at the capitol in Havana, Cuba. He became a naturalized U.S. citizen in 1938 and was a member of the Architectural League of New York and the National Sculpture Society. Sambugnac's sculptures are at the David W. Dyer Federal Building and United States Courthouse where he crafted two cast-stone lunettes in 1938. The low-relief panels portray two allegorical figures representing themes of the spirit of justice on the lintels above the leather-covered doors. Love and Hope shows a young woman playing the lyre, while Wisdom and Courage depicts a seated figure gazing at a tablet of the law.

His work in Cuba was for a memorial for Jose Marti.
