= Berta Margoulies =

American sculptor

Berta O'Hare Margoulies (September 7, 1907 – March 20, 1996) was an American sculptor.

She was born in Lovitz, Congress Poland. Her family migrated to Belgium during World War I and from there to the Netherlands and then the United Kingdom and then to the United States where she graduated from Hunter College in 1927. She then began studying sculpture at the Art Students League and from there she moved to Paris where she studied at the Academie Colarossi, Academie Julian and the Ecole des Beaux-Arts. She had been planning to study with Emile Antoine Bourdelle, but he died before they could meet.

She returned to the United States in 1931, and in 1937 was one of the founders of the Sculptors Guild. In 1939, she executed a relief sculpture at the United States Post Office, Canton, New York. She also taught at the Finch School in New York and the Roerich Museum. The post office and sculpture was listed on the National Register of Historic Places in 1988.

She was one of 250 sculptors who exhibited in the 3rd Sculpture International held at the Philadelphia Museum of Art in the summer of 1949.

Throughout her life, she also held various jobs as a translator, research worker, and social worker.
