= Carl C. Mose =

American sculptor and art teacher

Carl Christian Mose
- Born: February 17, 1903; Copenhagen, Denmark
- Died: March 25, 1973 (aged 70); Carroll County, Maryland, U.S.
- Occupations: Sculptor, art teacher
- Spouse: Ruth Helming

Carl Christian Mose (February 17, 1903 – March 25, 1973) was an American sculptor and art teacher.

== Life ==
Mose was born in Copenhagen, Denmark circa 1903. He emigrated to the United States with his family as a child and he grew up in Chicago, Illinois. He was trained by sculptor Lorado Taft.

Mose designed a statue of baseball player Stan Musial, and it was installed at the Busch Memorial Stadium in St. Louis, Missouri. His statue of General John J. Pershing was installed in Jefferson City, Missouri. Mose also designed a statue called Eagle and Fledging for the campus of the United States Air Force Academy in Colorado Springs, Colorado. He sculpted the 66th issue of the long running Society of Medalists in 1962.

He taught at Washington University in St. Louis St. Louis School of Fine Arts from 1936 to 1947, at the Corcoran School of the Arts and Design, the Minneapolis Institute of Art, and Carleton College. His work was also part of the sculpture event in the art competition at the 1928 Summer Olympics.

Mose married Ruth Helming. He lived on a farm in Carroll County, Maryland, where he died of a heart attack on March 25, 1973, at age 70.
