= Fredonia Post Office =

- US Post Office—Fredonia
- U.S. National Register of Historic Places
- Fredonia Post Office in 2026

- Location within Kansas Location within the United States
- Location: 428 Madison St., Fredonia, Kansas
- Coordinates: 37°32′05″N 95°49′53″W
- Area: Less than one acre
- Built: 1939
- Architects: Louis Simon (architect); Lenore Thomas (artist)
- Architectural style: Classical Revival
- MPS: Kansas Post Offices with Artwork, 1936–1942 MPS
- NRHP reference No.: 89001638
- Added to NRHP: October 17, 1989

The Fredonia United States Post Office, located at 428 Madison St. in Fredonia, Kansas, was built in 1939. It was listed on the National Register of Historic Places in 1989 as US Post Office—Fredonia. It is a one-story, gable- and flat-roofed red brick building which is about 65 by 55 feet (20 m × 17 m) in plan. It includes a ten-part terra cotta sculpture titled "Delivery of Mail to the Farm", by artist Lenore Thomas. This was installed on the lobby wall above the postmaster's door in 1939.
