= Ahron Ben-Shmuel =

American artist (1903–1984)

- Born: January 18, 1903; New York City, New York, U.S.
- Died: February 24, 1984 (aged 81); Jerusalem, Israel
- Other names: Ben Shmuel, Aaron Ben Shmuel
- Known for: sculpture

Ahron Ben-Shmuel, also known as Ben Shmuel, Aaron Ben Shmuel (1903–1984) was an American artist, known for his direct carvered stone sculptures, figural granite work and paintings. He worked for the Works Progress Administration (WPA), and he was associated with left-wing politics despite his art having no clear political references.

== About ==
Ahron Ben-Shmuel was born on 18 January 1903 in New York City, New York.

He apprenticed for three years as a monument carver at a stone yard and eventually developed his own style. Jackson Pollock studied direct carving techniques under Ahron Ben-Shmuel between 1930 until 1933 in his Greenwich Village studio.

In 1936, Isamu Noguchi rented two carpenter shacks at 211 East 49th Street, and he repaired them so they could be used as art studios. Ben-Shmuel was Noguchi's friend and he subleased one of the units. The Guild Art Gallery (1933–1937) of New York City showed Ben-Shmuel work, in 1935 a joint exhibition was held with his friend Chaim Gross and two years later in 1937 a joint exhibition with Enrico Glicenstein, and Jean de Marco.

Ben-Shmuel was awarded the Guggenheim fellowship in Fine Arts in 1937 by the John Simon Guggenheim Memorial Foundation. There had been a judged art exhibition that was formed by artists who desired to assist in the World War II effort, titled "Artists for Victory, Inc" (1942) at the Metropolitan Museum of Art, Ben-Shmuel won fifth place with the first prize was awarded to Jose de Creeft.

== Death and legacy ==
He died 24 February 1984 in Jerusalem, Israel.

Ben-Shmuel's work is included in the permanent museum collection at Smithsonian American Art Museum, Museum of Modern Art (MoMA), Michener Art Museum, Albright-Knox Art Gallery, Brooklyn Museum, among others.

== Public art work ==
Year	Title	Location	Material	Notes
1937	Fawn	Techwood Homes Housing Project, between Pine and Hunnicutt Streets, Atlanta, Georgia		The housing project was demolished in 1996.
1937	The Boxers	Philadelphia Museum of Art, Philadelphia, Pennsylvania	Coopersburg granite; concrete base	Installed April 30, 1958.
1940	Coiled Snake	Philadelphia Zoo, Philadelphia, Pennsylvania	black granite; stone base	This work was made as part of the Works Progress Administration (WPA).
1942	George and Meta Conor-Wood Memorial Fountain	Philadelphia, Pennsylvania	Coopersburg granite; stone walls with slate steps and capping for the base	
1942	Figure of Job	Philadelphia Museum of Art, Philadelphia, Pennsylvania	bronze	
1958	The Laborer	East Fairmount Park, North Terrace of Ellen Phillips Samuel Memorial, Philadelphia, Pennsylvania	granite, on granite base	
