= Norman Raeben =

American artist (1901–1978)

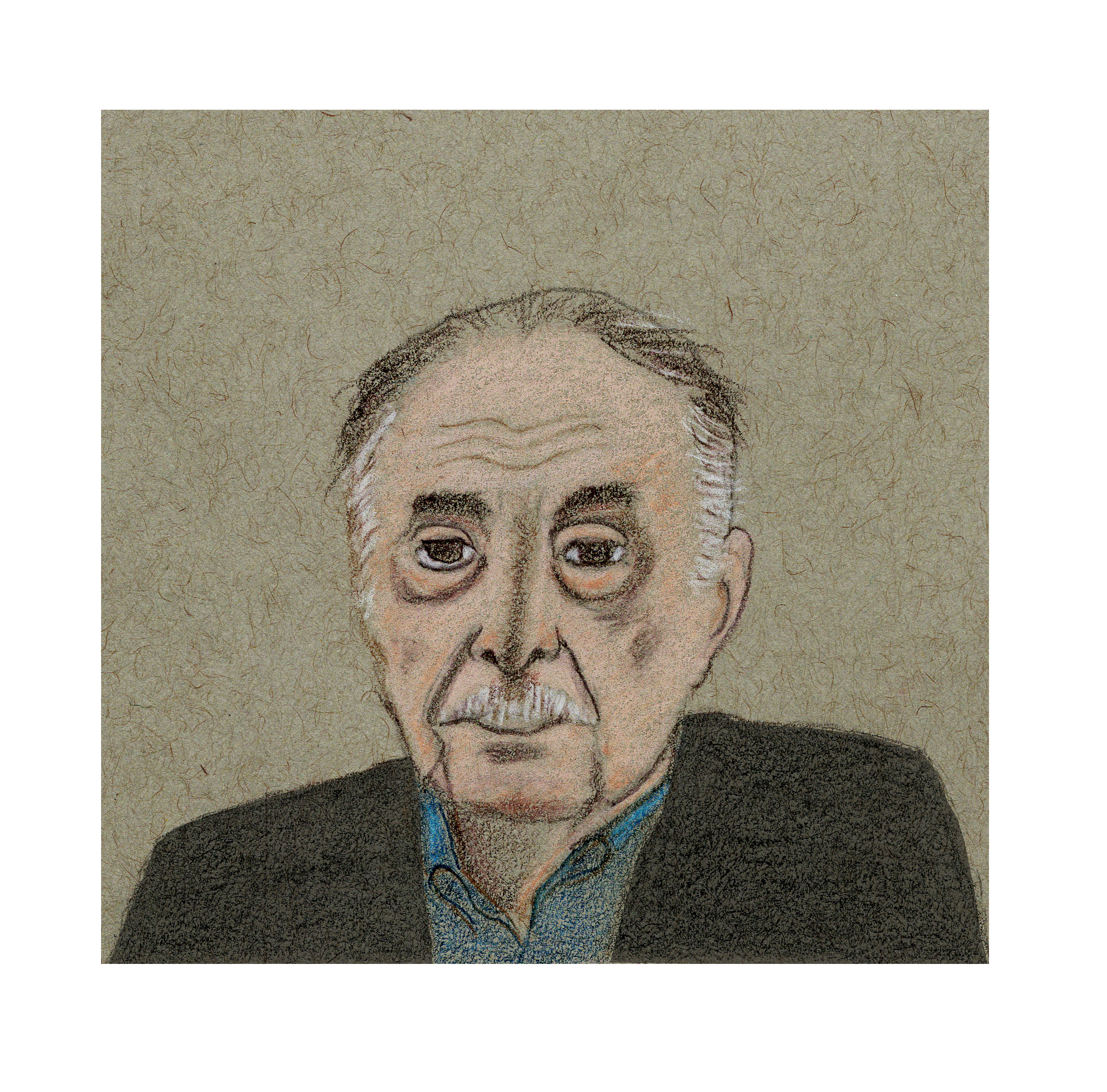
Norman Raeben

Norman Raeben (1901 – 12 December 1978) was an American painter, lecturer and teacher.

== Life ==
Numa Rabinowitz (aka Norman Raeben) was born in Kiev, in the Russian Empire, the youngest of the six children of Sholom Aleichem, famous Yiddish writer of various novels about Jewish characters, including Tevye the Milkman, which served a blueprint for the musical Fiddler on the Roof.

Raeben moved to New York City with his family a first time in 1907 and then permanently in 1914. After studying at the Educational Alliance with Abbo Ostrowsky, between 1918 and 1924, he took painting lessons at the Art Students League of New York from various painters, including Robert Henri, George Luks, Max Weber (artist) and John French Sloan, and was directly involved in the Ashcan School of Painting movement. After being active as a painter in New York and Paris in the 1920s and 1930s, in 1946 he opened a studio on the 11th floor of Carnegie Hall.

His students included Bob Dylan, Stella Adler, Polly Adler, Dorothy Bird, Bernice Sokol Kramer, Andrew Gottlieb, Janet Cohn, John Smith-Amato, Diana Postel, Lori Lerner, Rosalyn (Roz) Jacobs and the photographer, Larry Herman. Raeben's mission was to teach the art of painting through intuition and feeling, instead of through conceptualization. During the seventies, his inspiring lessons ran counter to the then prevalent conceptualism of contemporary mainstream art.

Early in 1974, Bob Dylan studied painting with Raeben five days a week from 8:30 am to 4:00 in the afternoon, for two months. This was when he was composing his album Blood on the Tracks. Dylan said that Raeben "put my mind and my hand and my eye together, in a way that allowed me to do consciously what I unconsciously felt." Dylan said that Raeben "didn’t teach you so much how to draw … he looked into you and told you what you were." Raeben taught Dylan how to create narratives that placed "yesterday, today and tomorrow all in the same room." Dylan's song "Tangled Up in Blue" took its title from a comment that Raeben made regarding one of Dylan's paintings.

Bob Dylan was mystified, at first, by Norman's didactic insistence on perceptual honesty, i.e. on not exaggerating the truth of what was seen, when first learning the basics of drawing. "Bob", Norman said, "look at that round coffee table. Now, show me how you would paint it."

Raeben was a chess prodigy. His father once claimed that if he earned millions from Hollywood, he would buy his son a gold chess set.

He died of a heart attack in the lobby of his apartment. He was survived by his wife, Victoria, his son, Jay Raeben, president of the Physicians Radio Network, and his sister–the author, Marie Waife‐Goldberg.

== Essays by Raeben's Students ==
Carolyn Schlam, a painter and author, in her book The Creative Path: A View from the Studio on the Making of Art, describes in detail his studio, his teachings, and the experience of being one of his students. She describes "riding up the in the elevator and hearing the voices of the opera singers, echoes of violins and pianos, and the myriad sounds" of artists working in the building’s many studios. Raeben was a "robust lion of a man" with a "commanding personality". Raeben's studio was not large, and had windows on all sides. The weekly schedule began on Monday, when he taught still life, then on Tuesday and Thursday a live model was provided. Raeben was a very involved teacher, and would demonstrate or lecture passionately. He would move about the room, often stopping at a student’s canvas, and calling the other students over for an impromptu lesson. He taught his students not only how to draw and paint, but also the meanings and philosophies underlying what they were doing, what it meant to be an artist, and Raeben's Ten Commandments.

Artist Roz Jacobs talks about her experience in the studio in the book Painting and Process. She also described Raeben's teaching methodology in the essays The Idiot and the Genius, included in the book Bob Dylan and the Arts. Songs, Film, Painting, and Sculpture in Dylan’s Universe (ESL, 2020), and Norman Raeben: Art Telescopes Time, published in the catalog Norman Raeben (1901-1978): The Wandering Painting (Sillabe Editore, 2024).

Artist Claudia Carr Levy talks about her experience in the studio in the essay “Norman Raeben,” published in the book Bob Dylan and the Arts Songs, Film, Painting, and Sculpture in Dylan’s Universe (ESL, 2020).

Artist and therapist John Amato analyses Raeben's artistic methodology in the essay "Art for Life’s Sake: The Work and Legacy of Norman Raeben", included in the book Bob Dylan and the Arts Songs, Film, Painting, and Sculpture in Dylan’s Universe (ESL, 2020).

== Academic Studies ==
A first contribution on Raeben's influence on Bob Dylan was published by scholar Alessandro Carrera in his book La voce di Bob Dylan. Un racconto dell'America in 2011.

More recently, his works and teachings have been collected and studied by scholar Fabio Fantuzzi, who published several articles and the treatise "All the Way from New Orleans to New Jerusalem": Norman Raeben e Bob Dylan (2020), which offers a comprehensive analysis of his life, art career, and influence on Dylan.

Other contributions on his art and influence can also be found in the book Bob Dylan and the Arts. Songs, Film, Painting, and Sculpture in Dylan’s Universe (ESL, 2020). The section Art, edited by Fabio Fantuzzi, collects essays and first-hand analysis of his works by academics, students and artists.

== Catalog and First Retrospective Exhibition ==
In 2024, Sillabe Editore published the first retrospective catalog of his works, title Norman Raeben (1901-1978): The Wandering Painting, curated by Fabio Fantuzzi as part of the UE-funded Marie Skłodowska-Curie project "POYESIS: Perspectives on Yiddish Cultural Evolution and its Legacy: Visual Arts, Theatre, ans Songwriting Between Assimilation and Identity. A Case Study". The catalog provides the first comprehensive collection of Raeben's works, seven essays on his art, career and influence, and the first biographical note with the list of all of his known exhibitions.

The catalog accompanied the first retrospective exhibition of Norman Raeben's works, titled Norman Raeben (1901-1978): la pittura errante, which was held at the Jewish Museum of Venice from November 24, 2024 to March 9, 2025. The exhibition was curated by Fabio Fantuzzi and organized in collaboration with Ca' Foscari University of Venice, Opera Laboratori, Sillabe Editore, Regione Veneto and European Union.

== TV Special Issues ==
On December 1, 2024, RAI 3 television dedicated a documentary on Norman Raeben and the exhibition Norman Raeben (1901-1978): la pittura errante, titled Il pittore errante.

On January 10, 2025, Antenna 3 television dedicated a special issue to Raeben and the exhibition Norman Raeben (1901-1978): la pittura errante, titled Norman Raeben: al Ghetto il "pittore errante" che insegnò a Bob Dylan.

== Bibliography ==
- Carrera, Alessandro. La voce di Bob Dylan. Un racconto dell'America. Milano: Feltrinelli, 2011.
- Fantuzzi, Fabio. "I dieci comandamenti dell'arte: Bob Dylan e l'eterno dilemma tra genio e plagio", Musica/Realtà, 105, 2014 .
- Fantuzzi, Fabio. "Cenni di ermeneutica ebraica nelle teorie di Norman Raeben, figlio di Scholem Aleichem e maestro di Bob Dylan", in Tales of Unfulfilled Times. Saggi critici in onore di Dario Calimani, ed. by Fabio Fantuzzi. Venezia: Edizioni Ca' Foscari, 2017: 53–77 .
- Fantuzzi, Fabio. "All the Way from New Orleans to New Jerusalem": Norman Raeben e Bob Dylan. Ph.D. thesis, Roma: Università degli Studi Roma Tre, 2020.
- Carrera, Alessandro, Maria Anita Stefanelli and Fabio Fantuzzi (ed. by). Bob Dylan and the Arts. Songs, Film, Painting, and Sculpture in Dylan’s Universe. Roma: Edizioni di Storia e Letteratura, 2020 .
- Fantuzzi, Fabio. “Painting Songs, Composing Paintings. Norman Raeben’s Influence on Bob Dylan”, in Bob Dylan and the Arts, eds. Stefanelli, Carrera, Fantuzzi. Rome: Edizioni di Storia e Letteratura, 2020: 209–232 .
- Fantuzzi, Fabio. “No Time to Think: Il tempo tra arte e canzone”, in L’Ulisse 26 (Nov–Dec 2023): 237–251 .
- Fantuzzi, Fabio. "Songwriting Tradition and the Interpretive Talent”, in Les Cahiers de littérature orale 94 (2023): 31–54.
- Fantuzzi, Fabio. “Per un’arte emigrante tra Ashcan School e avanguardie parigine”, in Quodilibet 4 (2024): 115–121.
- Fantuzzi, Fabio (ed. by). Norman Raeben (1901-1978): The Wandering Painting. Livorno: Sillabe Editore, 2024 .
