= Widener Gold Medal =

Prize awarded by the Pennsylvania Academy of the Fine Arts (1913-1968)

The George D. Widener Memorial Gold Medal was a prestigious sculpture prize awarded by the Pennsylvania Academy of the Fine Arts from 1913 to 1968. Established in 1912, it recognized the "most meritorious work of Sculpture modeled by an American citizen and shown in the Annual Exhibition." PAFA's annual exhibitions were open to all American sculptors, but an individual could be awarded the medal only once. Sculptors Paul Manship, Albin Polasek, Malvina Hoffman, Carl Paul Jennewein, Anna Hyatt Huntington, William Zorach and Leonard Baskin were among its recipients.

George Dunton Widener had been a Philadelphia businessman and a director of PAFA. He and his son Harry died in 1912 aboard the RMS Titanic.

The Widener Gold Medal was retired in 1968. Beginning in 1969, PAFA devoted its annual exhibitions solely to work by students in its school.

== List of Recipients ==
Year	Sculptor	Image	Work	Medium	Collection	Notes
1913	Charles Grafly		Head of Thomas Pollock Anshutz	bronze	Pennsylvania Academy of the Fine Arts	
1914	Paul Manship		Duck Girl	bronze	Rittenhouse Square, Philadelphia	
1915	Albin Polasek		Aspiration	bronze	Detroit Institute of Arts	A seated female nude holding musical pipes and kissing a cherub.
1916	Edward McCartan		The Spirit of the Woods	bronze	"Welwyn" (Harold Pratt estate), Glen Cove, Long Island, New York	A nude female figure dancing with a baby. Another example is at the Mead Art Museum at Amherst College.
1917	Attilio Piccirilli		The Flower of the Alps	marble		A bronze version was auctioned at Sotheby's NY, October 2, 2015.
1918	Albert Laessle		Penguins	bronze	Philadelphia Zoo, West Fairmount Park, Philadelphia	Other examples are at the Fine Arts Museums of San Francisco, Brookgreen Gardens, and elsewhere.
1919	Jess M. Lawson (later Jess Lawson Peacey)		Belgium, 1914			First woman sculptor awarded the Widener Gold Medal. Also awarded the 1918 Barnett Prize from the National Academy of Design.
1920	Malvina Hoffman		The Offering	bronze	Glenbow Museum, Calgary, Alberta, Canada	
1921	Evelyn Beatrice Longman		The Future	bronze	Nashville Parthenon, Centennial Park, Nashville, Tennessee	A standing female nude. Also awarded the 1918 Shaw Prize from the National Academy of Design, and the 1919 French Gold Medal from the Art Institute of Chicago.
1922	Beatrice Fenton		A Sea-Weed Fountain	bronze	Horticultural Hall, West Fairmount Park, Philadelphia	Another example is at Brookgreen Gardens.
1923	Brenda Putnam		Sea Horse Sundial	bronze	Private collection, Williamstown, Massachusetts	Also awarded the 1922 Barnett Prize from the National Academy of Design.
1924	Arthur Lee		Volupté; Voluptuousness	marble	Metropolitan Museum of Art	Other examples are at the Brooklyn Museum, the Museum of Modern Art, the Yale University Art Gallery, and in private collections.
1925	Walker Hancock		Toivo	bronze	St. Louis Art Museum	A bust of a Finnish youth. A bronze example is at the Museum of Fine Arts, Boston.
1926	Adolph Alexander Weinman		Narcissus	bronze	Norton Museum of Art, West Palm Beach, Florida	A marble example is at Brookgreen Gardens.
1927	Katherine Lane Weems		Narcisse Noir; Black Whippet	bronze	Museum of Fine Arts, Boston	Other examples are at the Reading Public Museum and the Museum of Science (Boston).
1928	Albert Stewart		Silver King Polar Bear	silvered bronze	Metropolitan Museum of Art	Also awarded the 1927 Speyer Prize from the National Academy of Design.
1929	Bruce Moore		Black Panther	bronze	Smithsonian American Art Museum	Other examples are at the Whitney Museum, and elsewhere.
1930	Mitchell Fields		Torso (Naomi}	marble	Wilfrid Israel Museum, Hazorea, Israel	
1931	Gladys Edgerly Bates		Eve			
1932	Carl Paul Jennewein		Indian and Eagle; Monument to the American Dead	gilded bronze plaster	Tours War Memorial, Tours, France	The sculpture is the centerpiece of a fountain. Jennewein's plaster model is at the Pérez Art Museum Miami. Another bronze example is at Brookgreen Gardens.
1933	John Gregory		Lyric Love; Monument for an Aviator's Grave	Carrara marble	Armstrong Browning Library, Baylor University, Waco, Texas	A winged female figure, partially nude.
1934	Concetta Scaravaglione		Mother and Child	plaster	Virginia Museum of Fine Arts, Richmond, Virginia	
1935	Heinz Warneke		Wild Boars	marble	Smithsonian American Art Museum	Another marble example is unlocated.
1936	Vincent Glinsky		The Awakening	marble	Brookgreen Gardens	A female nude reclining on a rock.
1937	Anna Hyatt Huntington		Greyhounds Playing	bronze	Pennsylvania Academy of the Fine Arts	
1938	Anthony de Francisci		Gilda, the Artist's Daughter	plaster	Smithsonian American Art Museum	Bas relief head.
1939	Harry Rosin		Eugenie		Philadelphia Museum of Art	Head of a Tahitian model.
1940	Carl L. Schmitz		(Model for) Foreign Trade	painted plaster	Smithsonian American Art Museum	Foreign Trade is a limestone relief panel on the exterior of the Federal Trade Commission Building, Washington, D.C.
1941	Dorothea Greenbaum		Tiny	bronze	Institute for Advanced Study, Princeton, New Jersey	A standing female nude.
1942	Janet de Coux		Deborah's Song			
1943	Henry Kreis		The Birth of a Nation	limestone	Ellen Phillips Samuel Memorial Sculpture Garden, Fairmount Park, Kelly Drive, Philadelphia	Located along the east bank of the Schuylkill River.
1944	Cecil de Blaquiere Howard		American Youth	Plaster	Private collection	Cecil Howard posing in US Army uniform in his New York studio in 1944, before his departure for London with the OSS. He stands by his daughter Line's portrait bust and "American Youth," also entitled "The Sacrifice," his sculpture symbolyzing the American Army's entry into war.
1945	José de Creeft		Head of Rachmaninoff	lead	Pennsylvania Academy of the Fine Arts	
1946	Waldemar Raemisch		Pietà			
1947	Adolph Dioda		Crucifix			
1948	Herbert Lewis Kammerer		Head and Shoulders with Bent Arms			
1949	Mitzi Solomon (later Mitzi Cunliffe)		A Voluptuous Object	pink marble		
1950	Hugo Robus		Dawn	plaster	Fonderia Battaglia, Milan, Italy	A life-size female nude yawning and stretching. Bronze examples are in private collections.
1951	Oronzio Maldarelli		Bianca, No. 2	bronze	Metropolitan Museum of Art	Other examples are at the Hirshhorn Museum and Sculpture Garden in Washington, D.C., and the Virginia Museum of Fine Arts in Richmond.
1952	Jacques Lipchitz		Prometheus Strangling the Vulture	bronze	Philadelphia Museum of Art	PMA bought Lipchitz's plaster model, and commissioned him to cast it in bronze, 1953. Another example is at the Walker Art Center in Minneapolis.
1953	Anthony Lauck		Monk at Prayer	limestone	Butler Institute of American Art, Youngstown, Ohio	Rev. Lauck was a Roman Catholic priest and an art instructor at the University of Notre Dame.
1954	Koren Der Harootian		Descent from the Cross			
1955	Student exhibition					
1956	Theodore Roszak		Hound of Heaven	steel with nickel and copper	Museum of Modern Art, New York City	
1957	Student exhibition					
1958	Kahlil Gibran		Voice in the Wilderness	welded iron	Pennsylvania Academy of the Fine Arts	
1959	Student exhibition					
1960	Lee Bontecou		Bird	bronze	Chase Manhattan Bank, New York City	
1961	Student exhibition					
1962	William Zorach		Puma	plaster	University Gallery, University of Delaware, Newark, Delaware	Other examples in bronze and granite are at Fairmount Park, Philadelphia; National Museum of Wildlife Art, Jackson Hole, Wyoming; and in private collections.
1963	Student exhibition					
1964	Geraldine McCullough		Phoenix			Other works include: Martin Luther King, Jr sculpture in Springfield, IL, Pathfinder in Oak Park, IL, and Our King, Dr. Martin Luther King, Jr. in Chicago, IL
1965	Student exhibition					
1966	Leonard Baskin		Seated Woman	carved oak	Pennsylvania Academy of the Fine Arts	
1967	Student exhibition					
1968	Seymour Lipton		Gateway	nickel and monel metal	National Gallery of Art, Washington, D.C.	

== See also ==
- Temple Gold Medal
- Beck Gold Medal
- Mary Smith Prize
