= 3rd Sculpture International =

1949 exhibition of sculpture in Philadelphia, US

Coordinates: 39°57′56″N 75°10′52″W

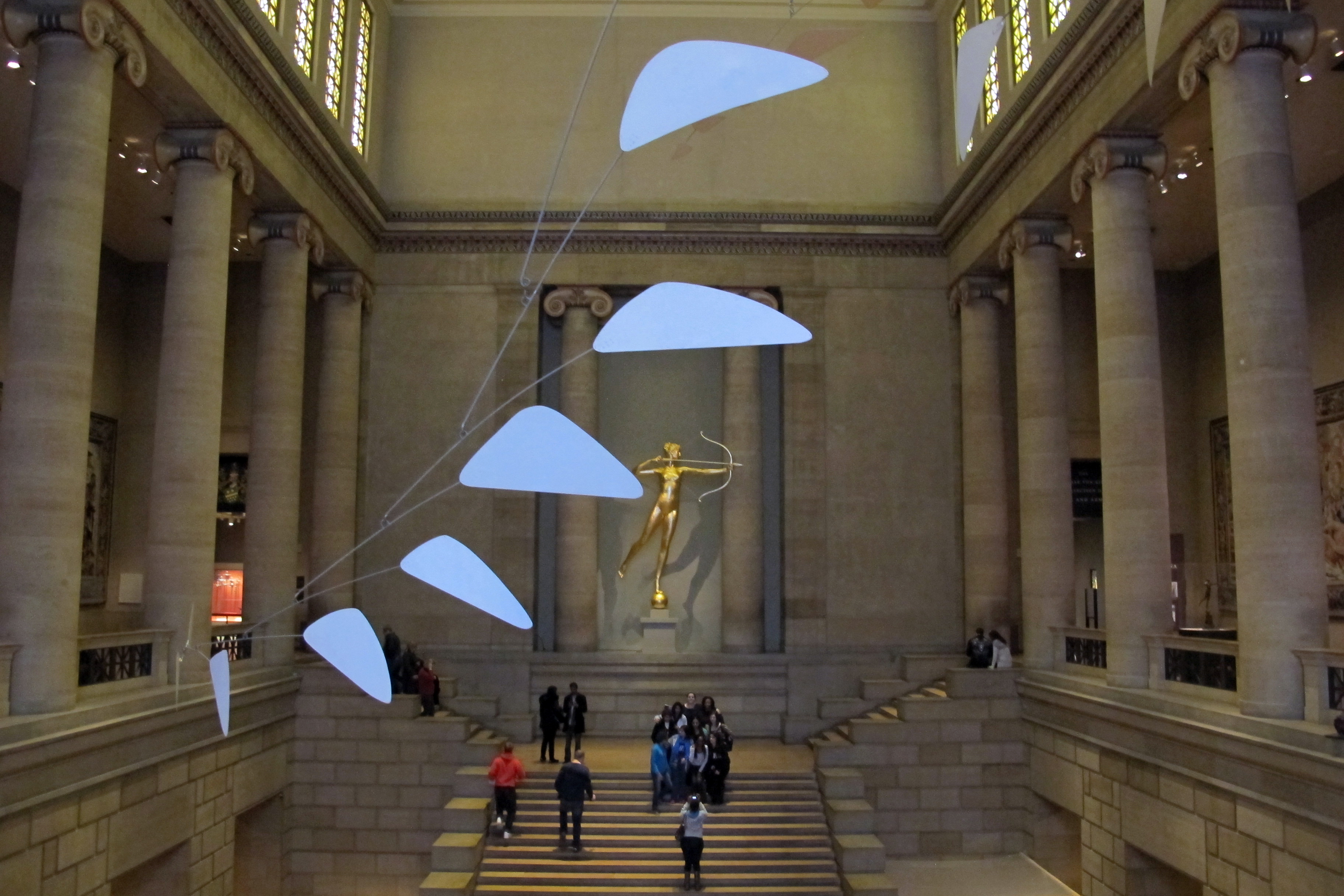
International Mobile (1949), by Alexander Calder, Philadelphia Museum of Art

3rd Sculpture International was a 1949 exhibition of contemporary sculpture held inside and outside the Philadelphia Museum of Art, in Philadelphia, Pennsylvania, USA. It featured works by 250 sculptors from around the world, and ran from May 15 to September 11, 1949. The exhibition was organized by the Fairmount Park Art Association (now the Association for Public Art) under the terms of a bequest made to the Association by the late Ellen Phillips Samuel.

Ellen Phillips Samuel was a member of the Fairmount Park Art Association and a supporter of many cultural activities in Philadelphia. When she died in 1913, she left the bulk of her estate in trust to the Art Association, specifying that the income be used to create a series of sculptural monuments “emblematic of the history of America.” When these funds became available upon the death of her husband in 1929, the Art Association appointed a planning committee, which decided that the Samuel Memorial should express major ideas and spiritual forces as well as chronological developments in American history.

To identify sculptors, the committee organized three international exhibitions at the Philadelphia Museum of Art. These Sculpture Internationals, in 1933, 1940, and 1949, brought together the works of hundreds of sculptors from the United States and abroad. The exhibitions contributed not only to the Ellen Phillips Samuel Memorial but also to the general awareness of contemporary sculpture throughout the Philadelphia area.

== Sculptors ==
Among the sculptors who exhibited were:

- Humbert Albrizio
- Connor Barrett
- Richmond Barthé
- Gladys Edgerly Bates
- Alexander Calder
- Cornellia Van A. Chapin
- Robert Cronbach
- Jo Davidson
- Jacob Epstein
- Mitchell Fields
- Minna Harkavy
- Vincent Glinsky
- Chaim Gross
- Cleo Hartwig
- Nathaniel Kaz
- Jacques Lipchitz
- Pablo Picasso
- Bernard Reder
- Marion Sanford
- Concetta Scaravaglione
- Mitzi Solomon
- William Steig
- Marion Walton
- A.A. Weinman
- Robert Weinman
- William Zorach

== The photograph ==
The June 20, 1949, issue of Life magazine featured the photograph 70 Sculptors by Herbert Gehr. It showed 70 of the sculptors seated on the staircase of the museum's Great Hall and surrounded by a number of their works. Gehr took the photograph on May 14, 1949, the day before the exhibition's opening. An intensive search has been underway since 2002 to identify all 70 sculptors in the photograph.
