= Mitchell Fields =

American sculptor

Mitchell Fields (1901 – 1966) was a Romanian-born American sculptor, known for his life-size sculptures, as well as for his portraits. Fields's works belong to the schools of Realism and Social Realism.

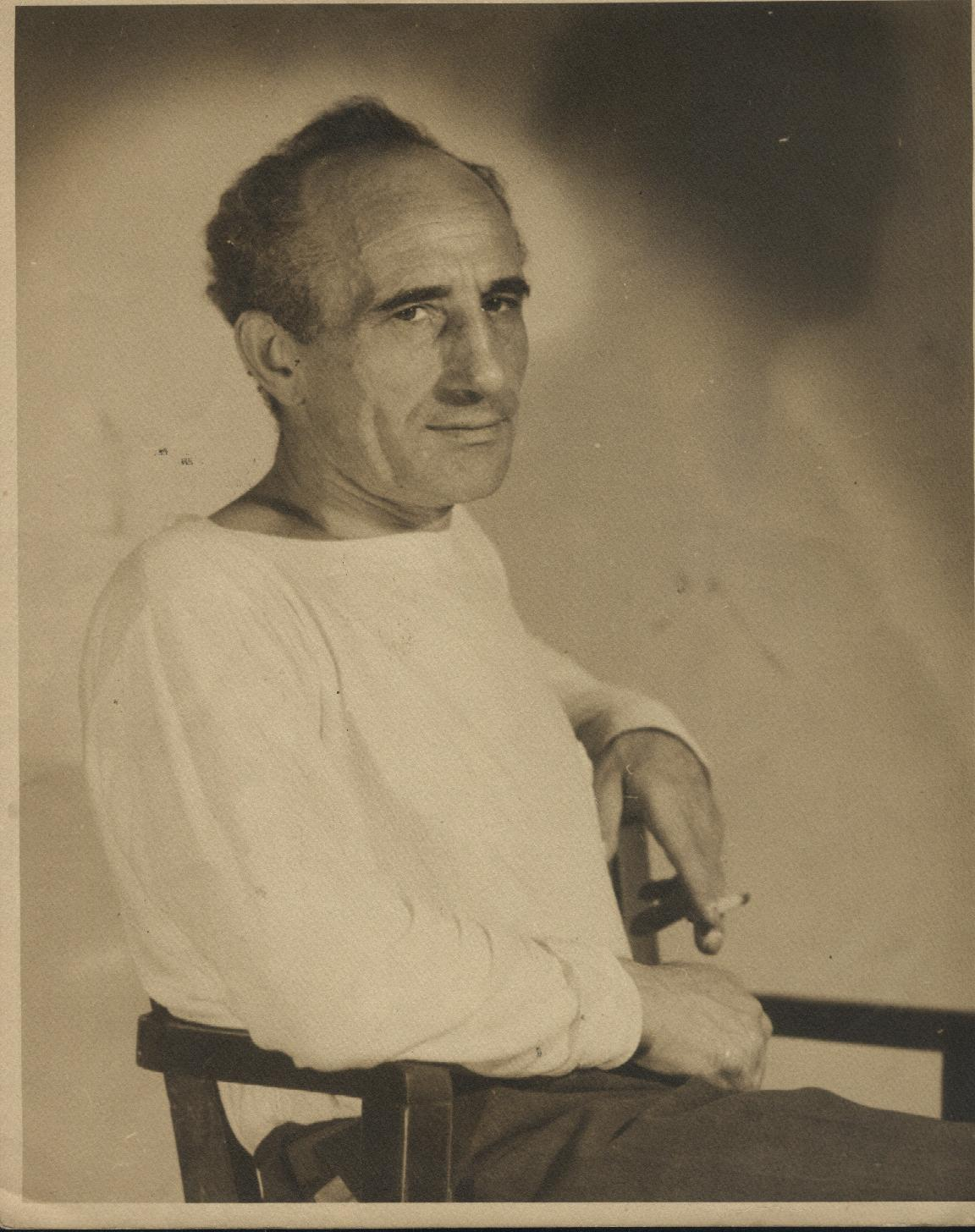
Mitchell Fields

== Early life ==
Mitchell Fields (né Mendel Feldman) was born on September 28, 1901, in Belcesti, a small village near Iaşi, Romania; he was the third of five sons of Marku Feldman and Tova Felderman. In 1907 the family immigrated to the United States and made its home in East Harlem (Manhattan), then an immigrant neighborhood. The parents supported the family by selling vegetables in markets in Manhattan and the Bronx.

== Education as an artist ==
Fields graduated from Stuyvesant High School, then as now a school whose pupils specialized in the sciences and engineering; early on he showed an interest in drawing and sculpture which was encouraged by his teachers. After a year at the Stevens Institute of Technology in Hoboken NJ he decided to pursue a career as a sculptor and enrolled at the National Academy of Design School of Fine Arts in New York and the Beaux-Arts Institute of Design in New York. The Beaux-Arts Institute aimed to train architects, sculptors and mural painters in accordance with the agenda of the French École des Beaux-Arts. Its student body consisted mainly of immigrants or first-generation Americans, many of whom came from a working-class background. Fields studied at Beaux-Arts from 1917 until 1927.

== Career ==
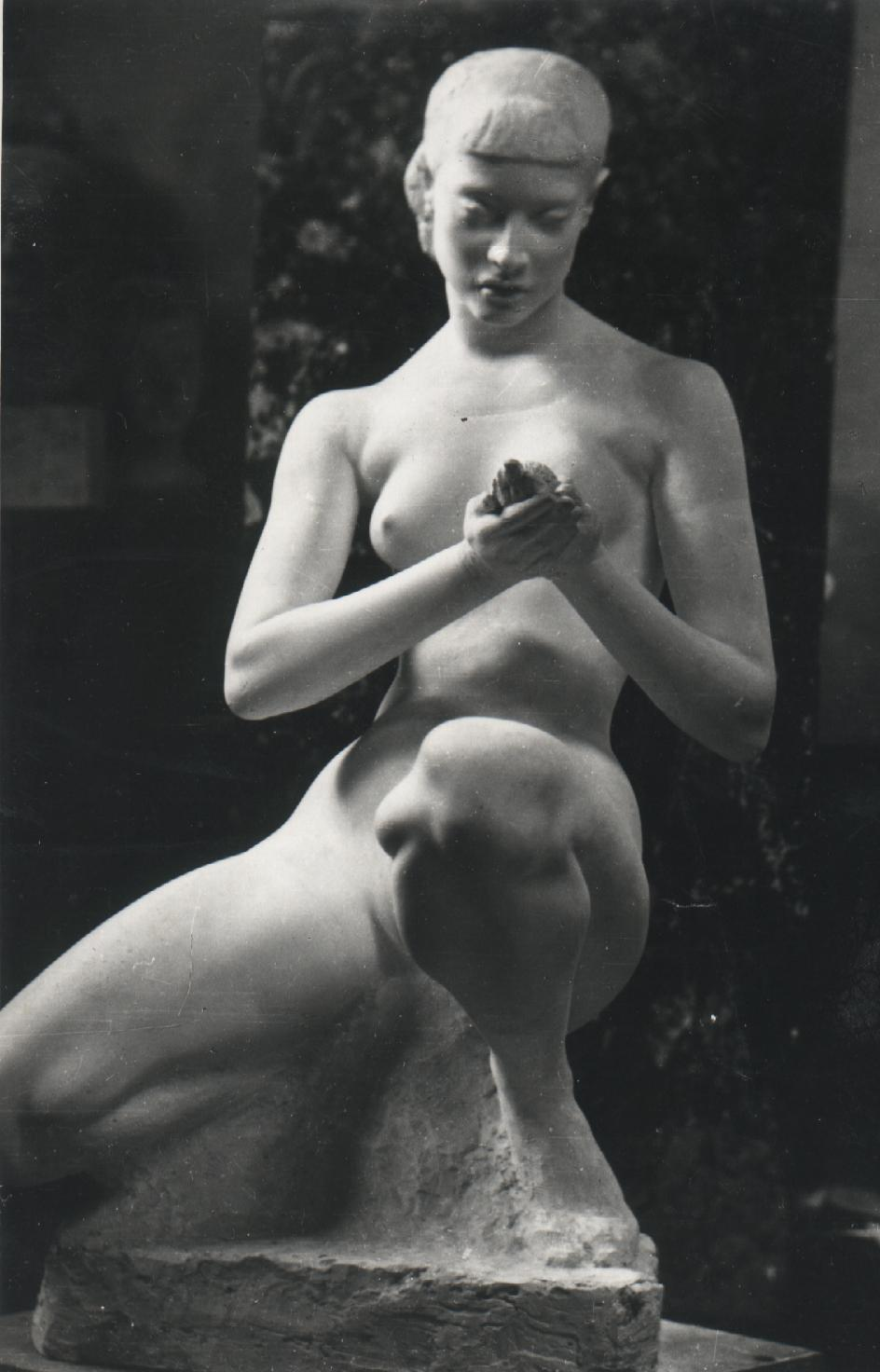
Young Woman Holding Wounded Bird, Sheba Medical Center School of Nursing, Ramat Gan, Israel

On completing his studies Fields began to work as a sculptor; he created in clay and plaster, in marble, and when commissioned to do so, cast his works in bronze. Fields continued living in New York, where he belonged to an informal circle of predominantly Jewish artists whose work was for the most part representational: Moses Soyer, Raphael Soyer, Ben Shahn, De Hirsh Margules, James Lechay, Myron Lechay, Joseph Kantor, Saul Berman, Tully Filmus, were among the painters; while after World War II the informal "circle" of which he was part included the sculptors Clara Bratt, Chaim Gross, Alexander Archipenko and Jacques Lipchitz.

During the early 1930s Fields was active in the John Reed Club, whose aim was to support leftist and Marxist artists and writers. On occasion Fields produced works with a political message: in 1935 he sculpted a monument to the civilians killed in the February 1934 Vienna Uprising, also known as the Austrian Civil War. The location of this statue is not known. There were, in any case, not many commissions to be had during the Great Depression. As did many artists at the time, Fields worked for the Federal Arts Project of the Work Projects Administration.

During the mid-1930s Fields divided his time between New York and Europe. The Guggenheim Foundation awarded him a fellowship in 1932 which enabled him to live and work in Paris for two years; subsequently, in 1935 a second Guggenheim Fellowship enabled him to reside and work in Moscow. Statues of his were placed in the Gorky Park of Culture and Leisure in Moscow, in the Museum of Modern Western Art in Moscow and in the Pushkin Museum in Moscow, now the Pushkin State Museum of Fine Arts. "Mother and Child with Oar", a life-size marble statue of a woman holding a baby in one arm and an oar with the other arm, was commissioned for Gorky Park; versions of the same theme by other sculptors were also placed in Gorky Park (Moscow). Attempts at locating this statue have not been successful; it was probably destroyed by German shelling during World War II. A plaster cast of the baby is still extant.

In 1938 Fields, his wife Beatrice (née Meyers) and their infant son Michael David returned to New York City. Fields continued creating sculpture until the entrance of the United States into World War II. Too old to be drafted into the army, he decided to "do his bit" for the war effort by working in a factory which engaged in war production; he operated a lathe on the production line until after the final Allied victory.

In the late 1940s, 1950s and 1960s Fields lived in New York and maintained a studio at 3 Gt. Jones St., New York. He was represented by the statue Bather in the Philadelphia Museum of Art's 3rd Sculpture International exhibit in 1949. He created a larger-than-life-size portrait bust of the late Albert Einstein which was placed in the Museum of Immigration on Ellis Island.

From time to time Fields taught courses in sculpture at the Art Students League of New York schools in Manhattan and Woodstock, New York, at the National Academy of Design School of Fine Arts in New York, as well as at the University of Iowa (Iowa City).

== Career in Israel ==
From the late 1950s until his death in 1966 Fields spent long periods of time in Israel, where he had a studio at 16 Da Modena St., Tel Aviv. During his stays in Israel he created portraits of personages for public spaces. These personages included Yehiel De-Nur (Ka-tzetnik), author; Yosef Sprinzak, first Speaker of the Knesset; Prof. Chaim Sheba, head of the Medical Corps of the Israel Defense Forces and later director of the Tel Hashomer Hospital and Medical Center, which now bears his name; Member of Knesset Avraham Hertzfeld, as well as works now in private collections.

During this period he created a portrait bust of the great Yiddish author Sholem Aleichem. This portrait is on exhibit in the Megiddo Regional Council Library. Fields also attempted a portrait bust of Anne Frank as she might have looked during the last months of her life in hiding with her family in Amsterdam, based upon available photographs from when she was younger. Fields sent photographs of the bust to Frank's father, Otto, who felt that the portrait did not represent his daughter as he remembered her during their last months together. His statue "Young Woman Holding Wounded Bird" is in the School of Nursing of the Sheba Medical Center at Tel Hashomer.

Fields was assisted by Robert Bannet, City Architect of Tel Aviv and head of the team of architects which planned Ramat Aviv. He had many friends among Israeli painters and sculptors; Agnes Adler and David Adler, sculptors who immigrated from Israel to the United States in 1961, are numbered among the latter. Fields made the acquaintance of Batya Lishanski, who was awarded the Dizengoff Prize for her sculpture, and of Marcel Janco, one of the founders of the Dada school of art. His friendships with Israeli painters and sculptors, as well as his observations of the vibrant artistic scene in late 1950s' Israel are described in the chapter which he composed for Assignment in Israel (1960).

Fields's work was to influence that of his eldest grandson, Reuven Fields Sadeh, a sculptor who worked mainly in metal. Although he was only five years old when his grandfather died, Sadeh, who lived and worked in Chapel Hill and Durham, North Carolina, grew up surrounded by Fields's sculpture. His own creations reflected the statuesque, essentially realistic character of his grandfather's work, as well as the latter's uncompromising excellence of craftsmanship.

Mitchell Fields died after a short illness on October 6, 1966. He is buried in Kibbutz Hazorea, Israel; his statue Naomi, which twice enabled him to receive a Guggenheim Fellowship, is exhibited at the entrance to the kibbutz's Wilfrid Israel Museum.

== Themes and style ==
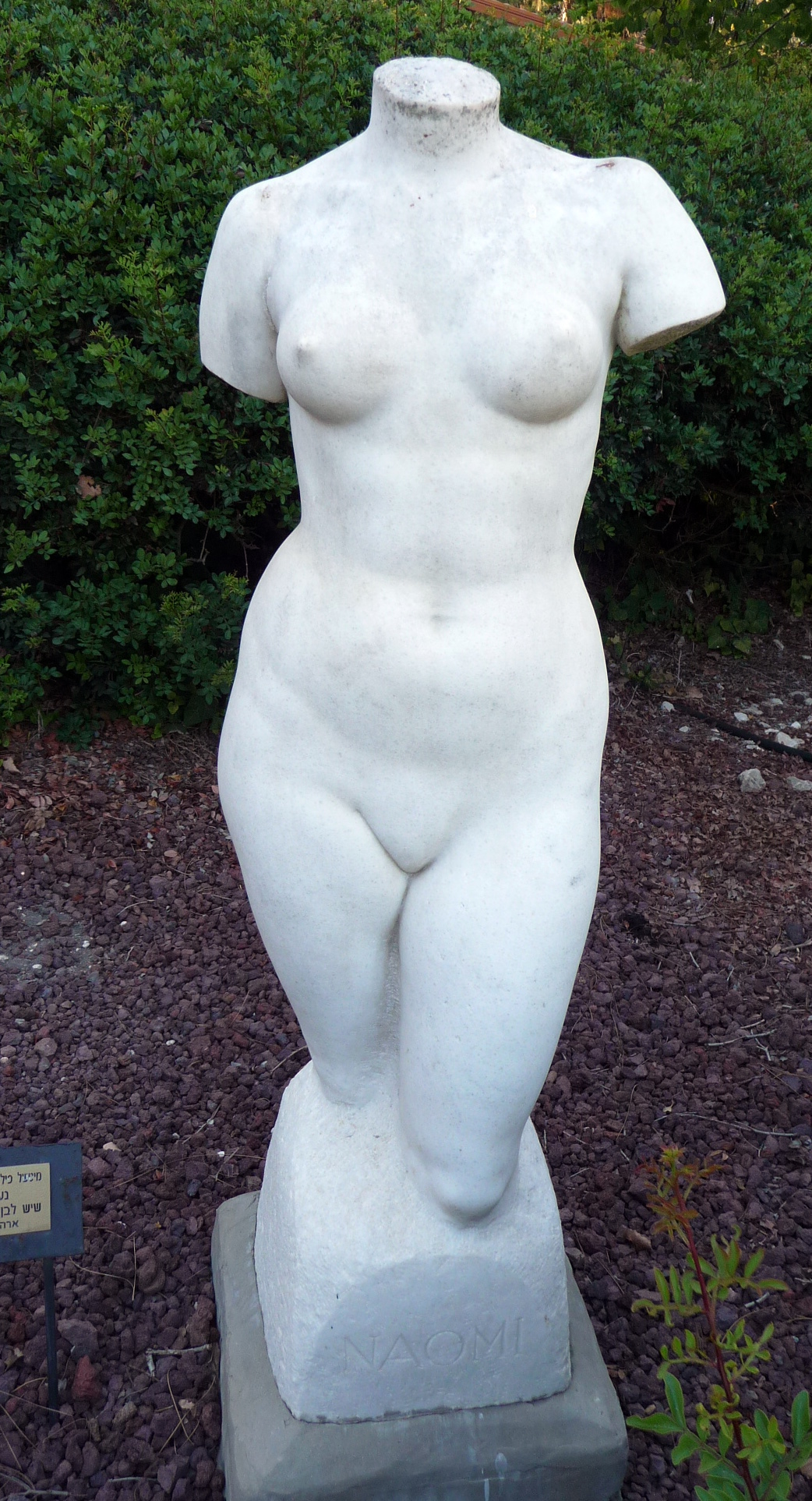
Naomi, Wilfrid Israel Museum, Hazorea, Israel

Fields's sculptural language was representational. Having been educated in the tradition of Realism, which subscribed to an ideology of objective reality and rejected what its practitioners saw as the exaggerated emotionalism of nineteenth-century Romanticism, he created life-size (and on occasion over-life-size) statues of the human body, both female and male. Fields depicted women as strong, capable figures, who were simultaneously feminine in a traditional sense. His portrait busts and bas reliefs were articulated in a non-abstract idiom.

As was the case with many American artists from immigrant families who came of age during the Great Depression, some of his works may be seen as part of the Social Realist movement, one of whose aims was to depict the working class as heroic. Yet he did not accept the tenets of Socialist Realism (for whose practitioners the purpose of art was to forward the international agenda of socialism or communism). Indeed, despite his left-wing political views, the large majority of his works do not bear a political message.

Even after World War II, when many American artists moved in the direction of Abstract Expressionism, Fields continued to create within the realist canon. During the early 1950s he began to work in ceramics, producing small tables and household items such as cups and vases. A short-lived attempt to sell the latter via a small business (Sculpture Products) did not succeed commercially. His ceramic art work, with its richly toned glazes and whimsical shapes, was his only attempt at adopting a semi-abstract idiom.

== Exhibitions ==
- Birobidjan Museum, Russia
- Brooklyn Museum, (one-man show)
- Gorky Literary Museum, Moscow
- Metropolitan Museum of Art, New York
- Museum of Modern Art, New York
- Museum of Modern Western Art, Moscow, USSR, (one-man show)
- Gorky Park of Culture and Leisure, Moscow
- Pennsylvania Academy of Fine Arts
- Pushkin State Museum of Fine Arts, Moscow
- Whitney Museum, New York
- Wilfrid Israel Museum, Hazorea, Israel
- 1939 New York World's Fair

== Portrait busts–partial list ==
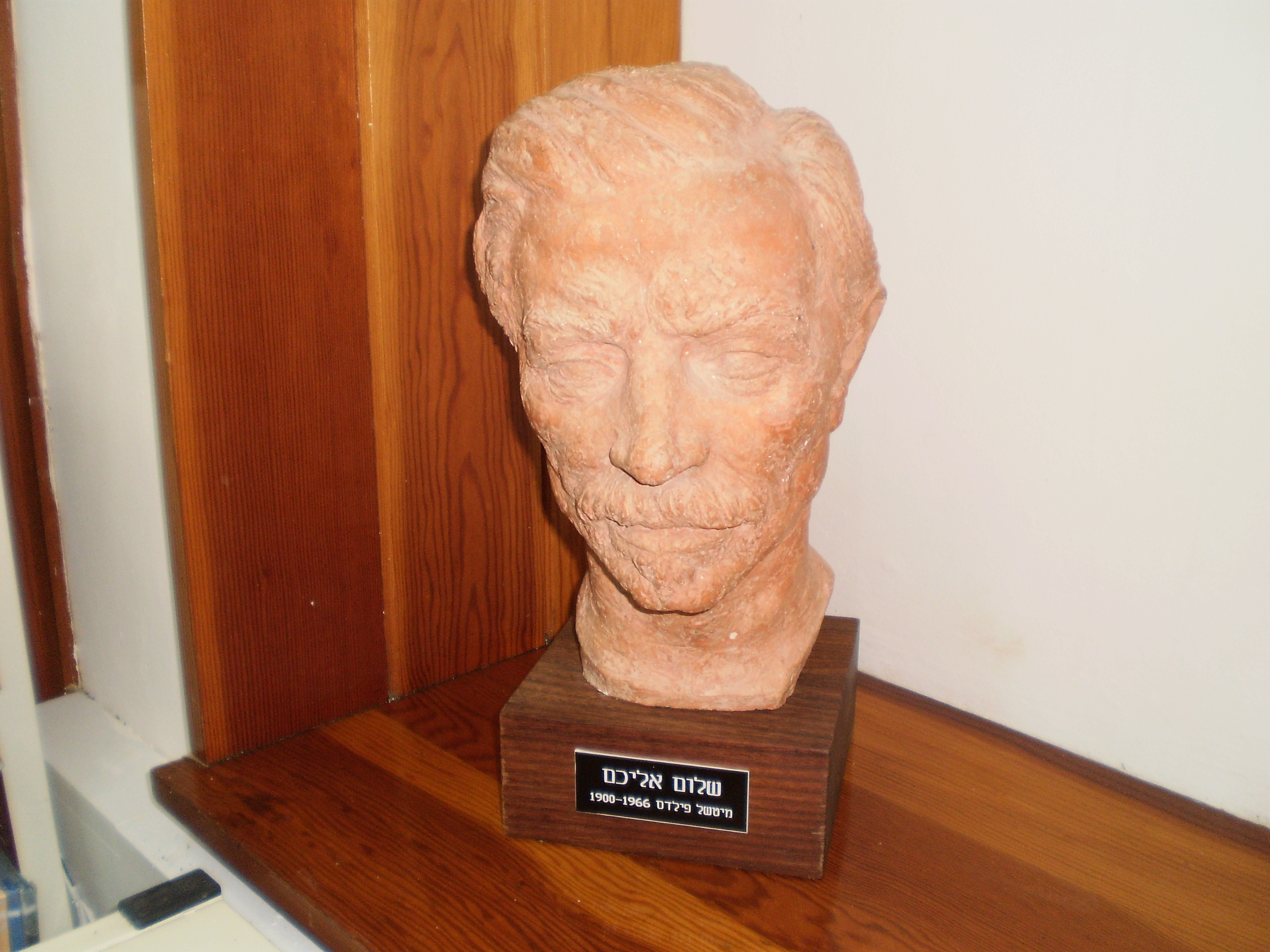
Portrait of Sholem Aleichem, Megiddo Regional Council Library, Israel

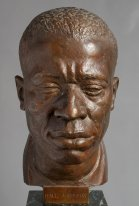
Portrait of Hall Johnson, Pushkin State Museum of Fine Arts, Moscow

- Shalom Aleichem (author)
- Ofra Bannet
- Yehiel De-Nur"Ka-tzetnik" (author)
- Theodore Dreiser (author)
- Albert Einstein (scientist)
- Michael Fields
- Anne Frank (author)
- Avraham Hertzfeld (Member of Israel Knesset)
- Hall Johnson (composer), Pushkin State Museum of Fine Arts, Moscow, Russia
- Hank Lifson
- Nelly
- Romain Rolland (author)
- Yosef Sprinzak (Member and Speaker of Israel Knesset)
- Chaim Sheba (head of Medical Corps, Israel Defense Forces)
- Sonja Tykhayeva (athlete)

== Life-size statues–partial list ==
- Angel
- At Rest
- Bather
- Beatrice
- Blossom
- Discus Thrower
- Fatigue
- Lesson of the Austrian Revolt (semi-life-size)
- Mother and Child – 2 versions
- Mother and Child with Oar
- Naomi
- Torso
- Young Woman Holding Wounded Bird

== Prizes and fellowships ==
- 1929 - Helen Foster Barnett prize, National Academy of Design
- 1930 – Widener Gold Medal, Pennsylvania Academy of the Fine Arts (for Naomi)
- 1932 – Guggenheim Fellowship
- 1935 – Guggenheim Fellowship
- 1945 – elected Associate Member, National Academy of Design
- 1949 – Watrous gold medal, National Academy of Design
- 1951 – Thomas R. Proctor Award, National Academy of Design (for Michael)
- 1955 – Watrous gold medal, National Academy of Design
- 1955 – Tiffany Foundation fellowship
- 1956 – Tiffany Foundation fellowship
- 1965 – Thomas R. Proctor Award, National Academy of Design
