= Marion Walton =

American sculptor

Marion Wetherill Walton aka Marion Walton Putnam (November 19, 1899 – December 11, 1996 ) was an American sculptor and teacher born in New Rochelle, New York.

== Early life and education ==
She was the daughter of Ernest Forster Walton and music patron Blanche Wetherill Walton, her father was killed in a Grand Central Station train accident in 1901 and she was raised by her mother.

She studied at the Art Students League, at Hunter College and in Paris with Antoine Bourdelle, at the Borglum School of Sculpture and at Bryn Mawr College.

== Career ==
Walton was a member of the Sculptors Guild and was one of 250 sculptors who exhibited in the 3rd Sculpture International held at the Philadelphia Museum of Art in the summer of 1949. She taught both at her studio in New York City and at Sarah Lawrence College.

Walton was a WPA Federal Art Project artist, for whom she created three 1942 limestone relief pieces, "Indian," "Mine Elevator" and "Campbell's Ledge" for the post office in Pittston, Pennsylvania.

She was chosen to create a large 15-foot outdoor sculpture called "Young Man with Cow" for the 1939_New_York_World's_Fair outside the Federal Building in the garden court.

== Personal life and family ==
Walton was the granddaughter of prominent Philadelphian abolitionists Edward Wetherill and Anna Thorpe Wetherill. Immediately after World War I, she volunteered with the American Committee for Devastated France as a driver.

In 1926, Walton married James Putnam (19 Jun 1893 - 3 Feb 1966), who served as a soldier in the American Ambulance Field Service Fund and as an ambulance driver in France in WWI. Later, Putnam worked for the publishing house, the MacMillan Company. They had one child, Christopher and later were divorced.

The late 1920s found Walton's mother Blanche Walton very involved in the New York music scene, at one point housing composer Béla Bartók during an American tour. Her apartment also hosted the first meeting of the American Musicological Society, a meeting that included Joseph Schillinger, Charles Seeger, and Joseph Yasser. She was also an early supporter, mentor and patron of the American composer Henry Cowell and Aaron Copland

Walton donated her papers to the Smithsonian Archives of American Art. The series contains letters received primarily by Walton and her mother, Blanche Wetherill Walton, from friends and colleagues like artist Charles Green Shaw, historian and suffragist Mary Beard, and novelist Vera Brittain. There is also a photo of Pablo Picasso in France with his signature.

There are scattered letters and RSVPS to James Putnam's publishing events and Blanche Walton's concerts from artists Béla Kádár, Rockwell Kent, Fred Dana Marsh, Georgia O'Keeffe, John Singer Sargent, Theo Stamos, and Abbott Handerson Thayer, composers Henry Cowell and Carl Ruggles, musician Pete Seeger (who included an original musical notation for a song and illustration as a wedding present to her and Putnam), lecturer Ruth Gage-Colby, photographer Roy E. Stryker, political figures James Forrestal, Lyndon B. Johnson, Eleanor Roosevelt, and Shirley Williams, and writers Carl Carmer and Margaret Storm Jameson.

During WWII, Walton met with and corresponded with Eleanor Roosevelt several times regarding the welfare of UK children abroad and hosting them in the USA until the war was over.

== Work ==
- University of Nebraska-Lincoln, Sheldon Museum of Art and Sculpture Garden, Lincoln, Nebraska
- USPO, Pittston, Pennsylvania, limestone panels
