= Minna Harkavy =

American sculptor (1887–1987)

- Born: Minna Rothenberg; 1887; Estonia
- Died: August 2, 1987 (aged 99–100); Bronx, New York City, New York, United States
- Education: Art Students League of New York, Hunter College
- Known for: Sculpture
- Spouse: Louis Harkavy (married)

Minna Harkavy (née Minna Rothenberg; November 13, 1887 – 1987; birth occasionally listed as 1895) was an Estonia-born American sculptor.

== Biography ==
Harkavy was born in Estonia to Yoel and Hannah Rothenberg and immigrated to the United States around 1900. She studied at the Art Students League of New York, at Hunter College, and in Paris with Antoine Bourdelle.

Harkavy was a WPA Federal Art Project artist, for whom she created a 1942 wood relief piece, Industry and Landscape of Winchendon for the post office in Winchendon, Massachusetts.

She was a founding member of the Sculptors Guild and showed a work, My Children are Desolate Because the Enemy Prevailed in the Second Outdoor Sculpture Exhibition Negro Head in the 1940–1941 and Woman in Thought in 1941.

Harkavy was a founding member of the New York Society of Women Artists. Politically she was known as a leftist and anti-fascist with a strong social consciousness. In 1931 she exhibited a bust of Hall Johnson in the Museum of Western Art in Moscow and the work was purchased for the Pushkin Museum there. In 1932 she represented the John Reed Club at an anti-war conference in Amsterdam.

A bust of Italian-American anti-fascist (and her lover) Carlo Tresca who was assassinated in New York in 1943 was installed in his birthplace of Sulmona, Italy.

Harkavy was one of 250 sculptors who exhibited in the 3rd Sculpture International held at the Philadelphia Museum of Art in the summer of 1949.

She married Louis Harkavy, a New York pharmacist who also wrote for Yiddish-language periodicals.

== Work ==
Harkavy's works can be found in:

- USPO in Winchendon, Massachusetts, United States
- Whitney Museum of American Art in New York City, New York, United States
- Merchandise Mart in Chicago, Illinois
- Hermitage Museum in Saint Petersburg, Russia

Harkavy's New England Woman, was displayed at the New York World's Fair of 1939
