= Educational Alliance =

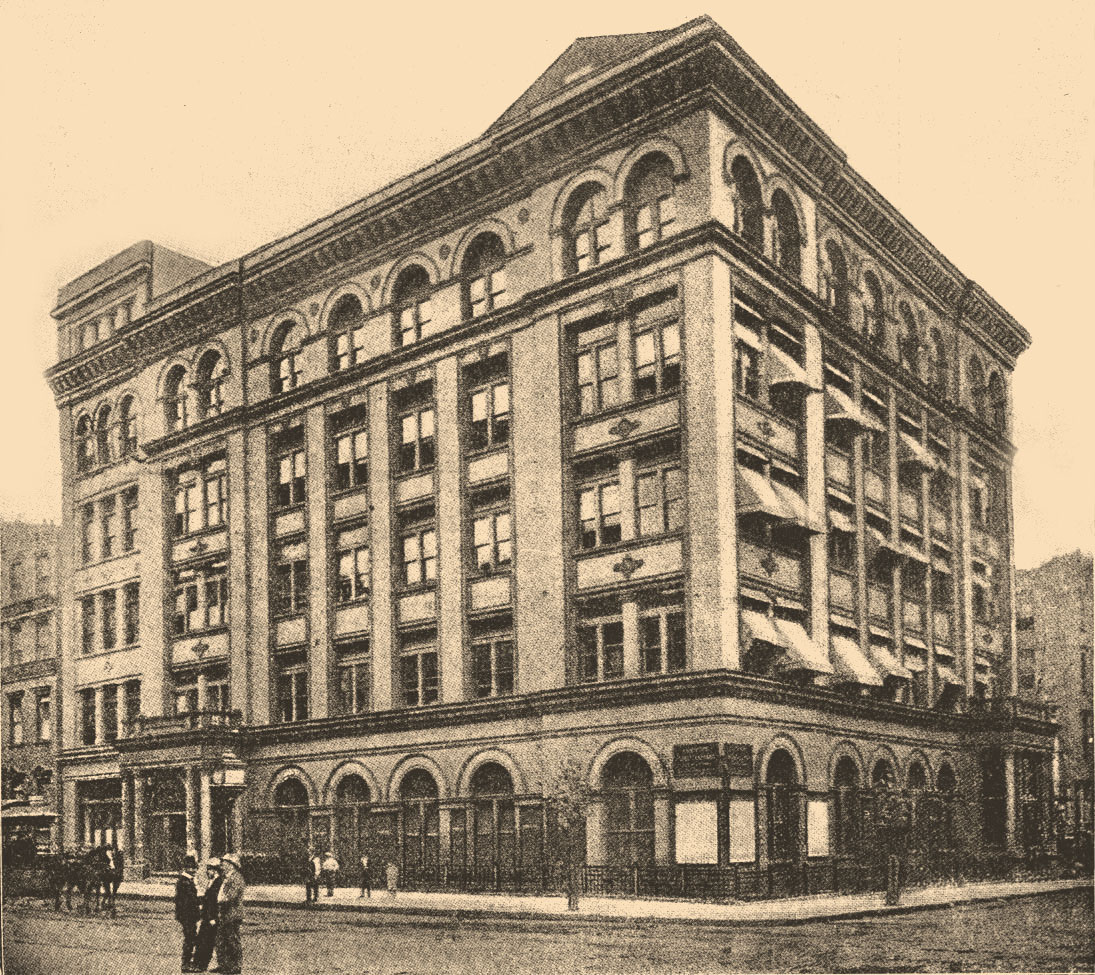
- The Alliance's flagship building, 197 East Broadway, in the early 20th century.
- Headquarters: 197 East Broadway, New York, NY
- Services: Programs in education, health and wellness, arts and culture, and civic engagement
- President and CEO: Rich Baum
- Website: www.edalliance.org

Educational Alliance is a leading social institution that has been serving communities in New York City's Lower Manhattan since 1889. It provides multi-generational programs and services in education, health and wellness, arts and culture, and civic engagement across 15 sites and a network of five community centers: the 14th Street Y, Center for Recovery and Wellness, Manny Cantor Center, Sirovich Center for Balanced Living, and Educational Alliance Community Schools.

== History ==
In 1889, the Alliance was founded as a partnership between the Aguilar Free Library, the Young Men's Hebrew Association (now the 92nd Street Y), and the Hebrew Institute. The organization's main purpose was to serve as a settlement house for Eastern European Jews immigrating to New York City.

Jewish philanthropists Isidor Straus, Samuel Greenbaum, Myer S. Isaacs, Jacob H. Schiff, Morris Loeb, and Edwin R. A. Seligman raised $125,000 to buy land and build the organization's five-story flagship building at 197 East Broadway.

Classes for children and adults were offered on subjects such as the English language, American history and civics, stenography, and cooking.

In 1903, the Children's Educational Theater was founded. Mark Twain attended a performance and subsequently joined the Board of Advisors. Eddie Cantor made his stage debut at the theater in 1905.

The Art School, founded in 1905 and then re-organized by Abbo Ostrowsky in 1917, trained some of the most famous American visual artists of the mid-20th century including Chaim Gross, Elias Newman, Philip Evergood, Ben Shahn, Leonard Baskin, Concetta Scaravaglione, Moses Soyer and Isaac Soyer, Joseph Margulies, Jo Davidson, Dina Melicov, Leo Gottlieb, Peter Blume, and Abraham Walkowitz.

The Alliance became one of the first organizations to offer Head Start for early childhood education in 1965. In 1996, the Alliance addressed the needs of the aging population of the neighborhood by helping establish one of the first naturally occurring retirement communities, for which it provides services.

== Community Centers ==
Educational Alliance's network of community centers includes the 14th Street Y, the Center for Recovery and Wellness, the Manny Cantor Center, the Sirovich Center, and Educational Alliance Community Schools.

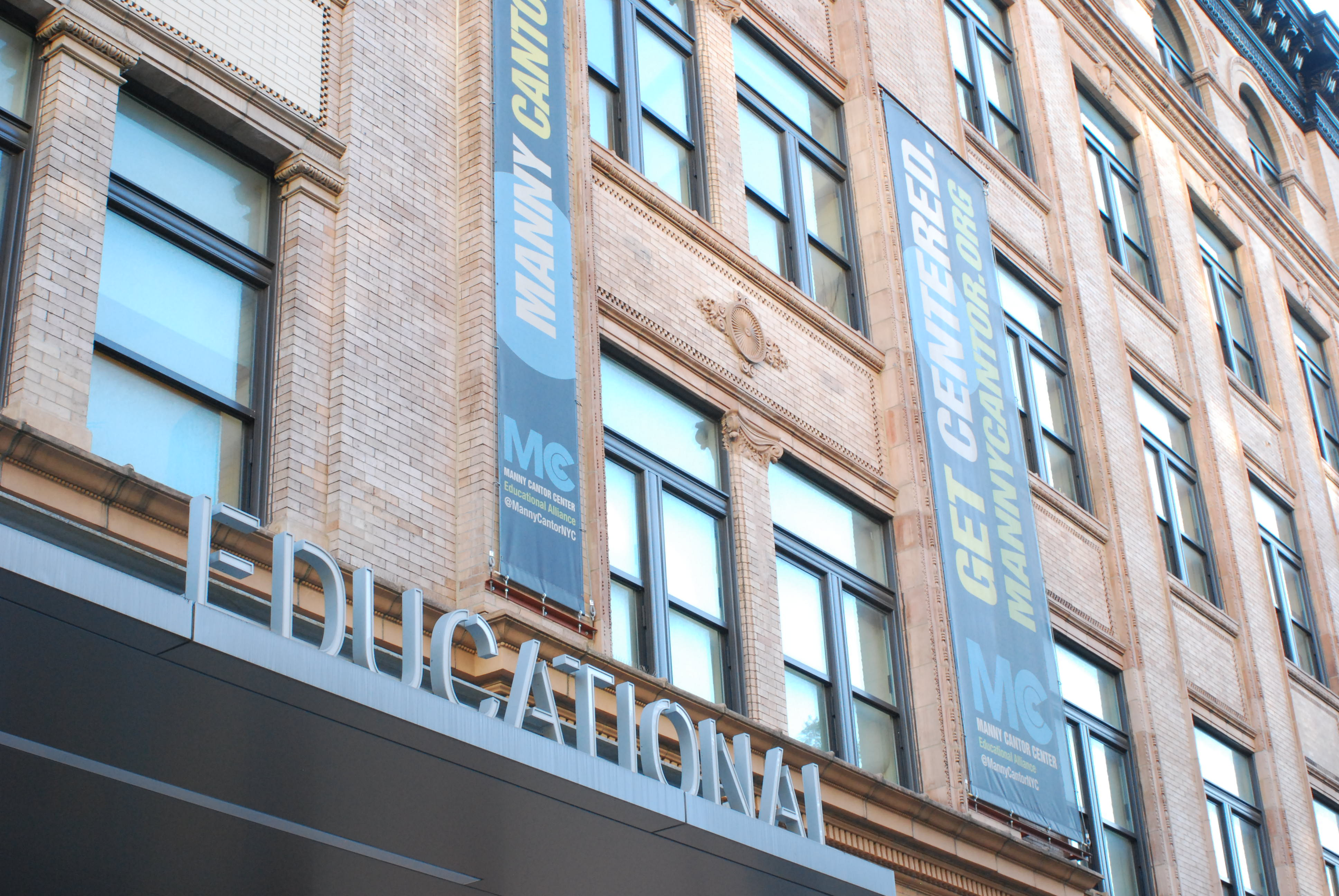
The Manny Cantor Center building at 197 East Broadway.

The 14th Street Y uses contemporary Jewish sensibilities as a source of inspiration, connection, and learning for the individuals and families it serves, which live primarily throughout New York City's East Village. It has a health and wellness center, childhood, parenting and adult education and enrichment programs, and an arts and culture department.

The Center for Recovery and Wellness (CRW) is a first-of-its-kind community center in New York State dedicated to community-based addiction support and overall wellness. It offers substance use disorder prevention, treatment, and recovery services certified by the NYS Office of Alcoholism and Substance Abuse Services (OASAS). CRW provides evidence-based care through an individualized person-centered approach, meeting clients both on-site and in-community. It also provides adult education and wellness services to the surrounding neighborhood.

The Manny Cantor Center is Educational Alliance's original flagship settlement house and is in its flagship building at 197 East Broadway. It offers events, programs, and critical services for people ages 0 to 100+ through its fitness center, preschool, art school, teen center, and Weinberg Center for Balanced Living, which serves older adults.

The Sirovich Center for Balanced Living provides older adults services and programs that acknowledge the interconnectedness of physical, mental/emotional, and social health. The center is free for those aged 60+ and aims to improve both individual and community wellness. Sirovich headquarters Educational Alliance's Older Adult Services, which also includes Project ORE and the Co-op Village Naturally Occurring Retirement Community (NORC).

Educational Alliance partners with local public schools to create the Educational Alliance Community Schools, where students have access to free extended learning time opportunities. School leaders are assigned an Educational Alliance Community School Director as a partner in the student-centered approach to addressing challenges which impede student learning during the traditional school day. The multi-generational programs and services are also accessible to students and their families. All Educational Alliance community schools operate as a Boys and Girls Clubs of America site, tailored to the individual needs of each school.

== Notable alumni ==
- Abraham J. Feldman (1893–1977), rabbi
- Adolph Gottlieb (1903– 1974), abstract expressionist painter, sculptor and printmaker
- Chaim Gross (1902–1991), sculptor and educator
- Lazarus Joseph (1891–1966), NY State Senator and New York City Comptroller.
- Zero Mostel (1915–1977), actor, comedian, and singer
- David Sarnoff (1891–1971), Industrialist
- Louis Schanker (1903–1981), abstract artist
- Isaac Soyer (1902–1981), Russian-born American social realist painter and educator
