= Anita Weschler =

American artist

Anita Weschler (December 11, 1903 – March 12, 2000) was an American sculptor, painter, interior decorator, poet, and author.

== Biography ==
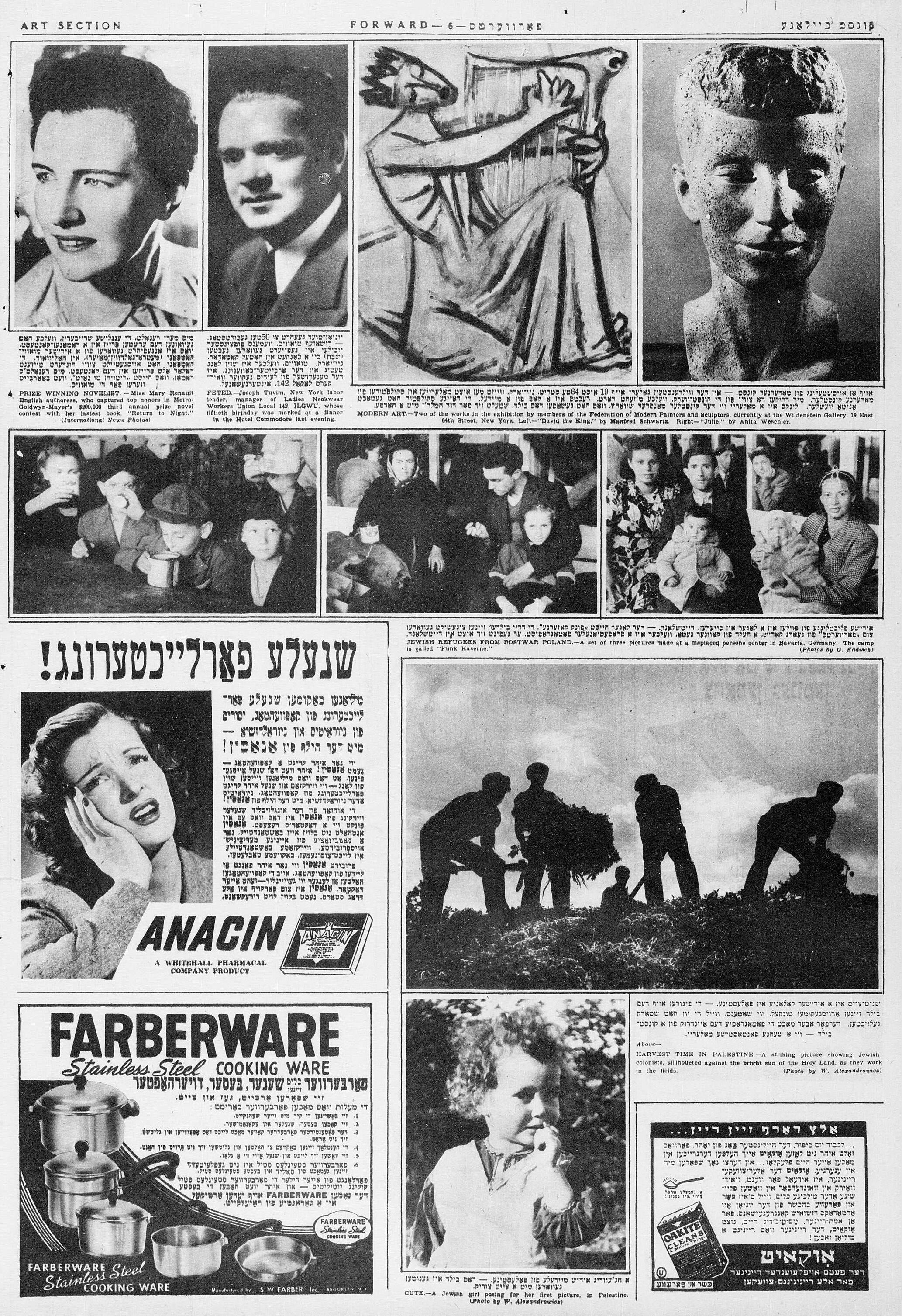
Weschler's work (top row, far right) featured in the art section of The Jewish Daily Forward, September 29, 1946

Weschler was a native of New York City, the daughter of J. Charles and Hulda Mayer Weschler. She first studied at the Horace Mann School before going on to the Parsons School of Design, the Art Students League of New York, and the Pennsylvania Academy of the Fine Arts. Her instructors included William Zorach and Albert Laessle. She married Herbert E. Solomon in 1928 and with him lived at Long Hill, a house in Erwinna, Pennsylvania. She retained an apartment in New York City to which she relocated permanently in the early 1980s. Solomon died in 1995; Weschler died at her Waverly Place apartment five years later, leaving a nephew and his family as her survivors.

Weschler came to sculpture almost accidentally, having previously studied fashion design, interior decoration, and painting. Beginning in the 1950s she turned again to painting, using plastic resins and synthetic glazes to produce colorful works.

Her first solo show took place at the Weyhe Gallery in 1937. Active in the Federal Arts Project, she produced a relief in terra cotta, Early Days at Elkin, for the Elkin, North Carolina post office in 1939. Her 1951 sculpture Victory Ball, in cast stone, is in the collection of the Metropolitan Museum of Art.

A bronze bust of William Zorach is owned by the Smithsonian American Art Museum. The Humanist, an early use of fiberglass as sculptural material, was owned by Warren Allen Smith, later becoming the property of the Institute for Humanist Studies. Other pieces are in the collections of the Whitney Museum of American Art and Yale University.

Weschler was a founding member of the Sculptors Guild and was a member of the National Association of Women Artists and the Federation of Modern Painters and Sculptors. She was active as a writer, producing work for numerous art journals and publishing a book of poetry, Nightshade, in 1931. Her papers are held at Syracuse University. She was awarded fellowships to Yaddo and to the MacDowell Colony.
