= Margaret Brassler Kane =

American sculptor

- Brassler Kane working in 1939
- Born: May 25, 1909; East Orange, New Jersey, U.S.
- Died: April 10, 2006 (aged 96); Cos Cob, Connecticut, U.S.
- Style: Figurative art, sculpture

Margaret Brassler Kane (May 25, 1909 – April 10, 2006) was an American figurative sculptor known for her use of the direct-carving method.

Brassler Kane was born to parents Hans and Mathilde Trumpler Brassler in East Orange, New Jersey, and moved with her parents to Brooklyn in 1918. She attended Packer Collegiate Institute, Syracuse University, and the Art Students League of New York, as well as took lessons with John Hovannes. She won a number of prizes for her art during the 1940s. Many of her pieces depicted contemporary life and tackled current issues of the day, including socioeconomic injustice and war. Brassler Kane was married to Arthur Ferris Kane in June 1930.

One of Brassler Kane's best-known works is a group of large relief panels carved in limewood, each six by six feet: Symbols of Changing Man (1937–39), Earthbound (1950–57), and Micro-Macrocosm (1960–67). The panels depict the history of humanity, exploring themes of science, technology, industry, religion, and social conflict. However, until 2018, all of the panels had never been exhibited together. Blackout, which shows a family of refugees fleeing from war, was exhibited at the Metropolitan Museum of Art in 1942 in a contemporary art show entitled "Artists for Victory." Bread and Wine (1940) is a bronze work that contrasts impoverished figures on a Great Depression-era breadline with well-off bargoers mingling over cocktails. Harlem Dancers (1937), carved in Tennessee marble, is in the collection of the Smithsonian American Art Museum.

Kane was a founding member of the Sculptors Guild.
