= Dina Melicov =

American sculptor

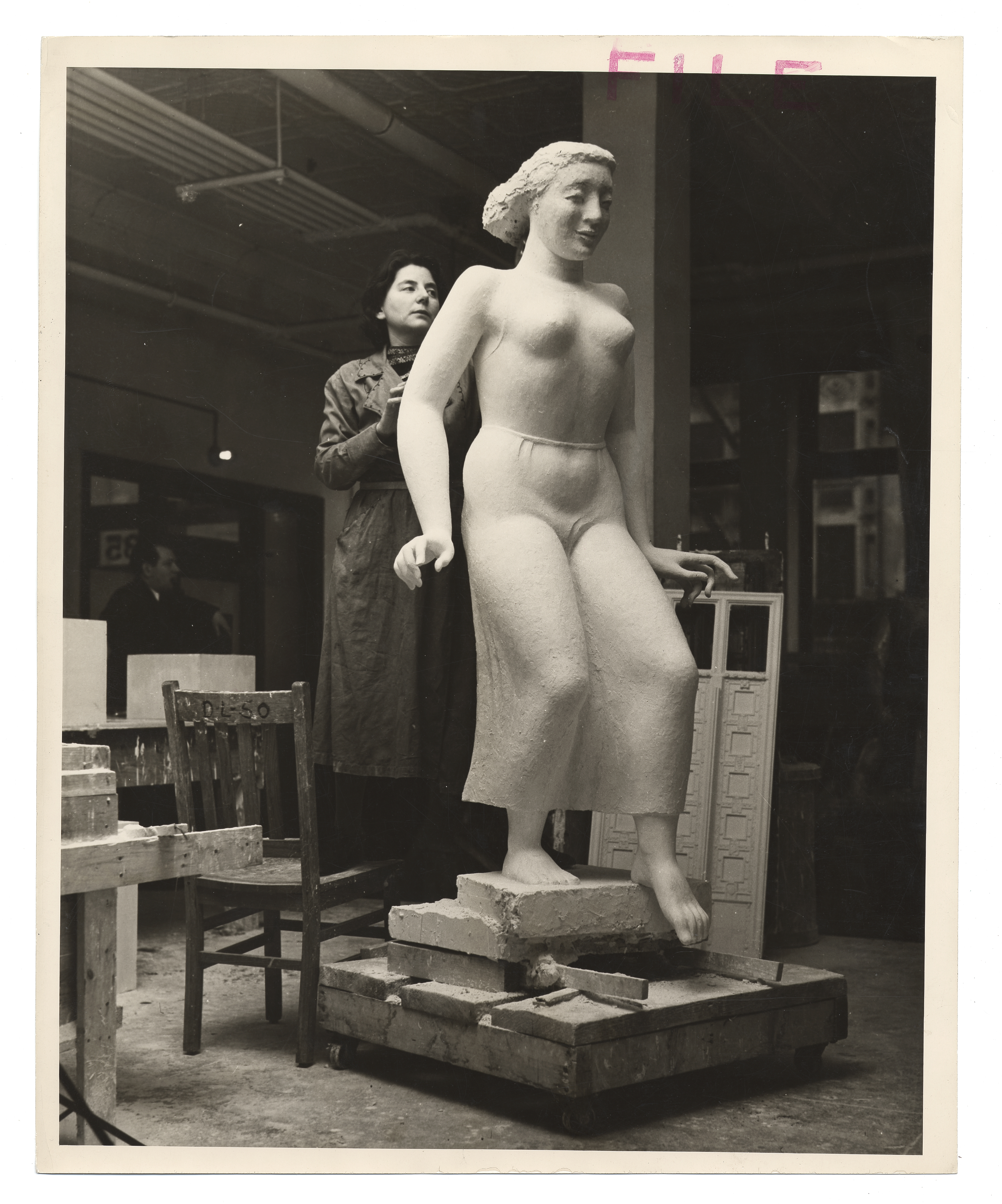
- Dina Melicov, from the Archives of American Art
- Born: 1905
- Died: 1969 (aged 63–64)
- Known for: Sculpture

Dina Melicov (1905–1969) was an American sculptor, and painter who studied at The Educational Alliance Art School. She graduated from Wadleigh High School for Girls, and studied with Solon Borglum. She married Samuel Gould.

Dina Melicov was a member of the Sculptors Guild and the National Association of Women Artists. She worked for the Federal Art Project. Her works include a 1942 statue of Dr. Joseph Priestley, sculpted of red mahogany, located at the Northumberland, Pennsylvania Post Office and Head of a Child for Public School 216 in New York City.

Her papers are held at the Archives of American Art (AAA), with the Smithsonian Institution in Washington, D.C.
