= Bernard Reder =

- Born: 29 June 1897; Czernowitz, Bukovina, now Ukraine
- Died: 7 September 1963; New York City
- Occupations: Artist, sculptor, etcher, engraver and architect

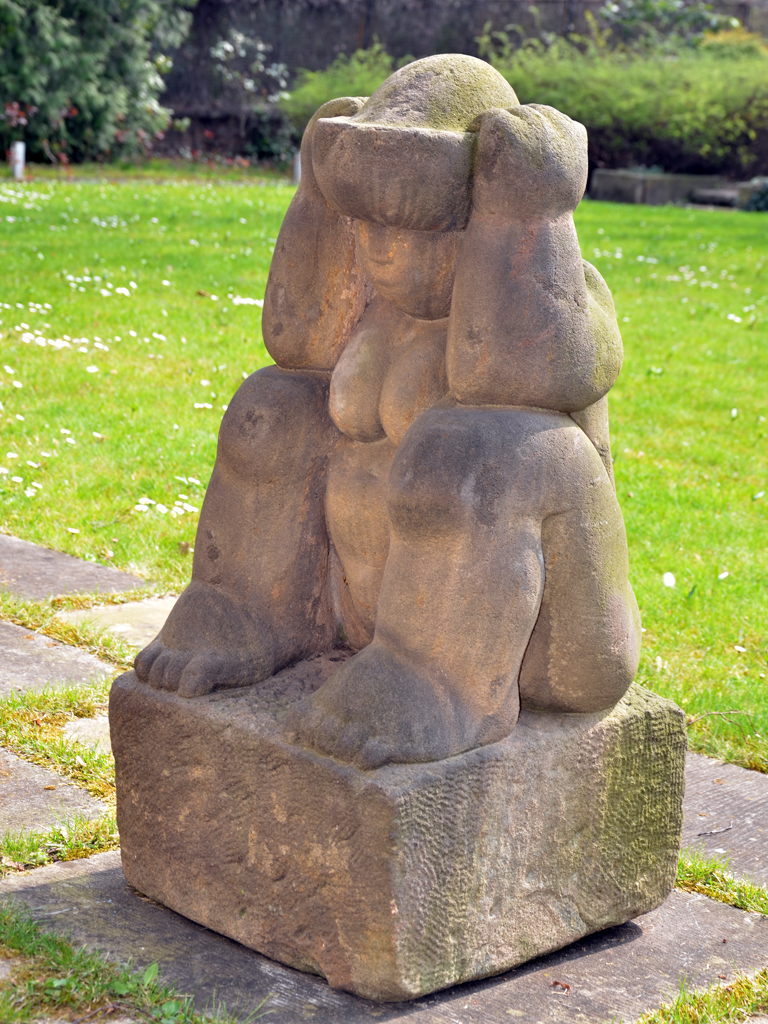
Sitting figure, sandstone sculpture by Bernard Reder, created in Prague around 1930

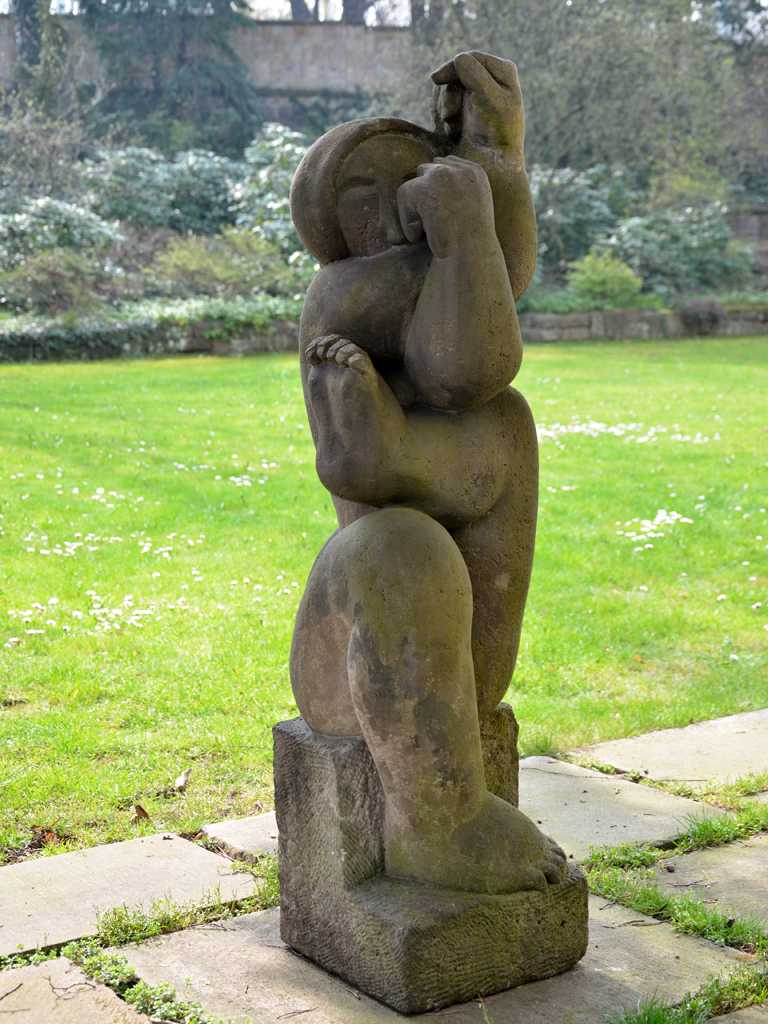
Female figure, sandstone sculpture by Bernard Reder, created in Prague around 1930

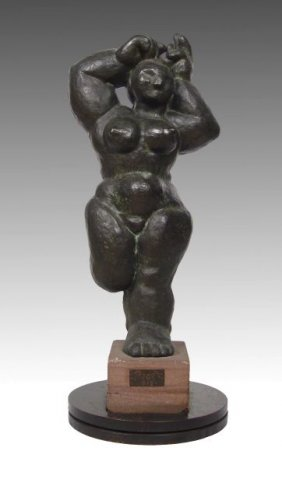
Woman by Bernard Reder

Bernard Reder (29 June 1897 – 7 September 1963) was an artist, sculptor, etcher, engraver and architect, born in Czernowitz, Bukovina, (Chernivtsi, Bokovina) part of Austria before World War II and a centre of Jewish and Hasidic culture. His subjects were drawn from Jewish folklore, from Greek mythology, the Bible, and also from François Rabelais.

Reder is quoted as having said, "We were born already drunk with fantasy", referring to his early life in Bukovina. The son of a Jewish innkeeper, at 17 he was conscripted into the Austrian army and spent World War I in the trenches. He went on to study at the Academy of Fine Arts in Prague. While working on his sculptures in his spare time, he supported himself by carving cemetery monuments. He moved to Prague in 1930 because of antisemitic demonstrations. In 1935 Reder had his first solo exhibition at the gallery of Manes, an association of artists in Prague. This exhibition created a sensation and was widely published by newspapers in Prague, Paris, Wienna and Basel. Most sculptures were sold.

Two years later, in 1937, he moved to Paris and became a good friend of the sculptor and painter Aristide Maillol. In 1940 he exhibited at the Wildenstein Gallery in Paris. Later that year, Reder was forced to flee Paris to escape from the Nazis, and Maillol secured a passage for him and his wife to travel to Spain, where he was imprisoned for illegal entry. On his release, they travelled to Havana, Cuba, where Reder influenced many artists.

All the works in his Paris studio were later destroyed by the Germans. Reder arrived in New York City in 1943, but in 1945 he became partially paralysed by a serious illness, and concentrated more on woodcuts and drawings. He became an American citizen in 1948.

Rader exhibited at the 3rd Sculpture International held in Philadelphia in 1949 and is one of the sculptors in the 70 Sculptors photograph taken there.

He was shown regularly at the Whitney Museum and was shown at the Philadelphia Museum of Art in 1949. In 1954, Reder went to Italy to sculpt in Rome and Florence. In 1956, he was given a one-man exhibition at The Galleria d'Arte Moderno L'Indiano, Florence, which received much attention and acclaim from art historian John Rewald. In 1961 he was given a solo one-man retrospective exhibition show at the Whitney Museum and for the first time in its history the museum devoted three of its floors to a single artist.

Bernard Reder died in 1963 in New York. His last four years were very productive, producing over thirty-five bronze sculptures. He created many of these directly in wax using a lost-wax casting technique he had learned in Italy.

== Galleries ==
Reder's works are currently held in many collections, including the following:

- Whitney Museum of American Art
- Museum of Modern Art
- National Gallery of Art
- Brooklyn Museum
- New York Public Library
- Art Institute of Chicago
- Museu d'Arte Moderna in São Paulo, Brazil
- Hofstra University, Long Island, New York
