= Duck Girl (Manship) =

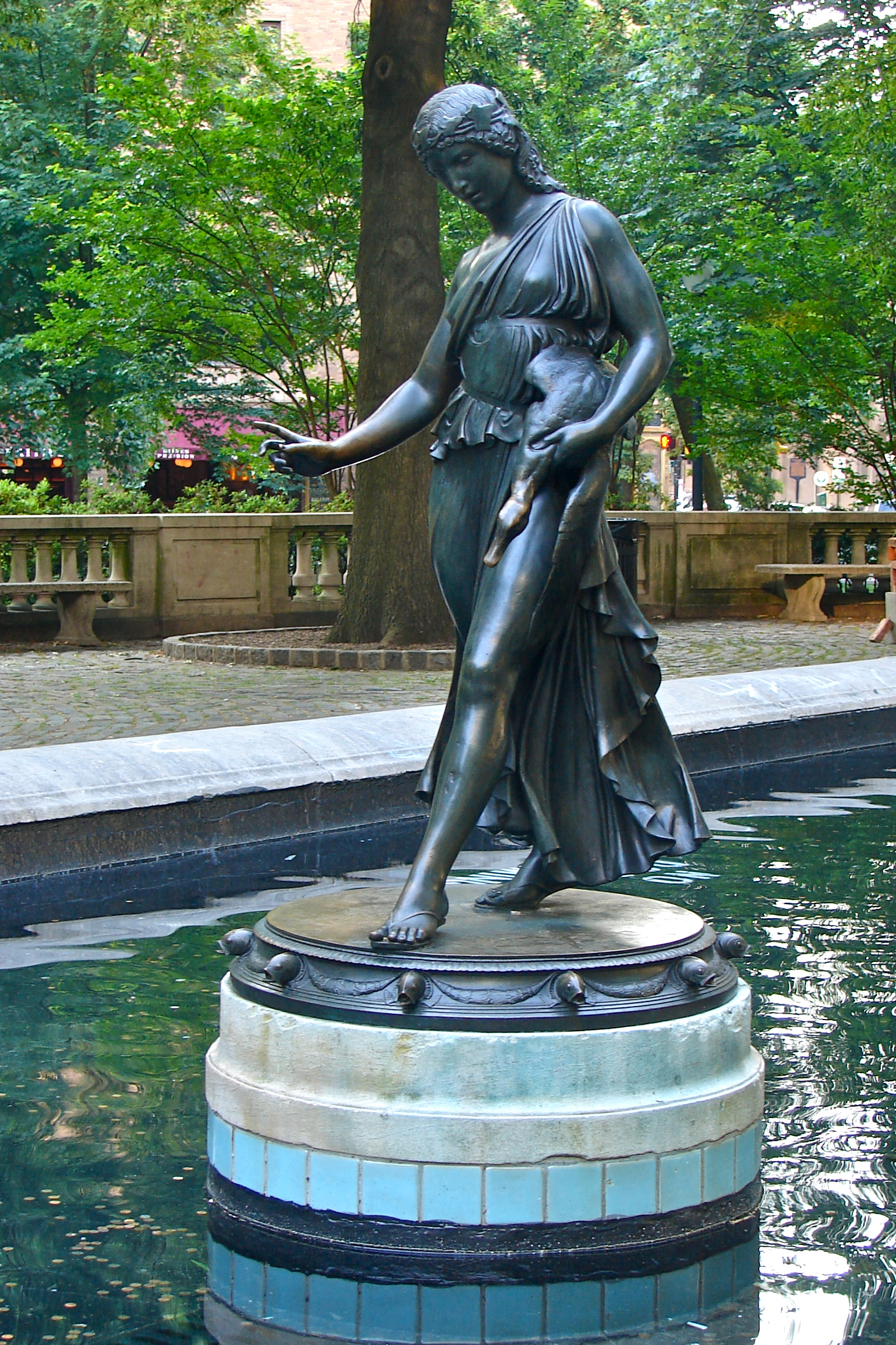
- Artist: Paul Manship
- Year: 1911
- Type: Bronze
- Dimensions: 150 cm × 87.6 cm × 87.0 cm (61 in × 34 1/2 in × 34 1/4 in)
- Location: Philadelphia, United States; 39.9493°N 75.1718°W
- Owner: City of Philadelphia

Duck Girl is a bronze sculpture by Paul Manship. It is located in Rittenhouse Square near 18th Street and Walnut Street in Philadelphia, Pennsylvania.

== History ==
Created in 1911, the sculpture was first exhibited in 1914 at the Pennsylvania Academy of Fine Arts, and was awarded the Widener Gold Medal by the Academy that same year.

After the Fairmount Park Art Association (now the Association for Public Art) purchased one of two casts of the sculpture that had been made by Manship, the sculpture was then installed in Cloverly Park in 1916. Later damaged, the sculpture was moved, in 1956, to storage, where it was found by members of the Rittenhouse Square Improvement Association, who then relocated the sculpture to Rittenhouse Square in 1960.

The sculpture is currently owned by the city of Philadelphia.

== Design ==
Evoking classic Greek sculpture, Manship's 5'1" tall bronze sculpture on a 2'8" limestone base depicts a young girl holding a duck.

== See also ==
- List of public art in Philadelphia
