= 70 Sculptors =

70 Sculptors, by Herbert Gehr

70 Sculptors is a photograph taken by Life photographer Herbert Gehr on May 14, 1949.

The picture was published by LIFE in their June 20, 1949, edition, covering most of pages 112 and 113. That the picture used most of two pages was in itself unusual. The photograph was part of the magazine's coverage of the 3rd Sculpture International exhibition, which was organized by the Fairmount Park Art Association (now the Association for Public Art) and held at the Philadelphia Museum of Art from May 15 to September 11, 1949. The picture shows 70 of the 254 sculptors whose work was being displayed, as well as a fair number of their pieces.

The image is anchored by Bernard Reder's monumental sculpture Wounded Woman. Reder is seated in the second row, second seat from the left. Hanging from the ceiling is Alexander Calder's International Mobile, while Calder himself sits, almost directly beneath it, in the center of the second row.

Besides its showing in LIFE magazine, a very large printing of the photograph was used as the cover of the exhibition press release. It also was reproduced in Bach's Public Art in Philadelphia (1992), where it is allotted a full page.

== Sculptors identified ==
The 70 sculptors depicted remain largely unidentified. Those identified include:

- Alexander Calder
- Jo Davidson
- Nathaniel Kaz
- Jacques Lipchitz
- Bernard Reder
- Mitzi Solomon
- Carl Milles
