= Nathaniel Kaz =

American sculptor

Nathaniel Kaz (March 9, 1917 - December 13, 2010) was an American sculptor who was born in New York City. His parents were musicians and moved to Detroit when Kaz was young. It was in Detroit when he began his art studies with Samuel Cashwan. After moving to New York, Kaz continued his studies at the Art Students League where he was trained by George Bridgman and William Zorach. In 1988 he was elected into the National Academy of Design as an Associate member and became a full Academician in 1991. His son Eric Kaz is a musician and songwriter.

== Work ==
Sculptures by Kaz are on exhibition and can be found in the collections of:

- Brooklyn Museum
- Whitney Museum
- Metropolitan Museum of Art
- Chicago Art Institute
- Museum of Modern Art
- Pennsylvania Academy
- University of Nebraska
- Philadelphia Museum of Art
- New Britain Museum of American Art
- Binghamton University

Kaz also produced sculpture under the auspices of the Federal Art Project. He was a founding member of the Sculptors Guild, along with Chaim Gross, Paul Manship, Jose de Creeft, Herbert Ferber, William Zorach, Vincent Glinsky and José de Rivera. Kaz exhibited at the 3rd Sculpture International held in Philadelphia in 1949 and is one of the sculptors in the 70 Sculptors photograph taken there.

== Awards and accolades ==
Kaz has won and received multiple awards and accolades over the course of his life, including: Michigan Sculpture Prize, 1929; Section of Fine Arts Award, 1940; Artists for Victory award, 1942; Audubon Artists 6th Annual, 1947; Sculpture prize, Brooklyn Museum, 1948 and 1952; Alfred G.B. Steel Memorial Prize, 148th Annual exhibition at Pennsylvania Academy of Fine Arts, 1953.

- 1976 received the Award of Merit for his sculpture The Prophet exhibited at the National Academy of Design
- 1981 won the Silver Medal for creative sculpture at the Annual Audubon Artists
- 1983 won the Medal of Honor at the Annual Audubon Artists
- 1988 received the Margaret Hirsch Levine Memorial Award
- 1988 he was awarded the Agopoff Award in the 163rd Annual Exhibition

In 2006, Kaz was awarded the National Sculpture Society's Gold Medal and Maurice B. Hexter Prize at the 73rd Annual Exhibition. He was also awarded in 2006, the Lifetime Achievement in Sculpture Award by Westchester County and the Sculptors' Guild. Kaz had been an instructor at the Art Students League for more than 50 years.
