= Sculptors Guild =

Society of sculptors promoting public interest in contemporary sculpture

- Abbreviation: SG
- Nickname: The Guild
- Formation: 1937
- Type: Arts organization
- Legal status: 501(c)3 nonprofit corporation
- Purpose: To promote, encourage, and support sculptors and sculpture
- Headquarters: New York City, United States
- Official language: English
- Website: https://www.sculptorsguild.org

Sculptors Guild, a society of sculptors who banded together to promote public interest in contemporary sculpture, was founded in 1937. Signatories to the original corporation papers (Sculptors Guild, Inc.) were Sonia Gordon Brown, Berta Margoulies, Aaron Goodelman, Chaim Gross (who became the first President), Minna Harkavy, Milton Horn, Concetta Scaravaglione, Warren Wheelock, and William Zorach. The inaugural exhibition of the Guild was held April 12 – May 31, 1938, on a vacant lot at Park Avenue and 39th St. This outdoor exhibit, the first of its kind in New York City, hosted 40,000 visitors paying an admission price of ten cents to view the work. Owing to the tremendous success of this first exhibit, the Brooklyn Museum held an exhibition of contemporary American sculpture by Guild members, October 21- November 27, 1938.

== History ==
The Guild's mission is to "promote, encourage, and support sculptors and sculpture through personal interaction, professional development, exhibitions and community outreach." The Sculptors Guild is one of the oldest artist-run organizations in New York City one of the few to survive from the Great Depression into the 21st century. It continues to promote sculpture and sculptors through exhibitions and educational outreach programs. The founders, who were at the forefront of American Modernism, stated their primary objective in an early exhibition catalogue: "to unite sculptors of all progressive aesthetic tendencies into a vital organization." Past Guild Members have included Louise Bourgeois, Lin Emery, Chaim Gross, Ibram Lassaw, Louise Nevelson, George Rickey, Jose Ruiz de Riviera, David Smith, Herbert Ferber and Seymour Lipton.

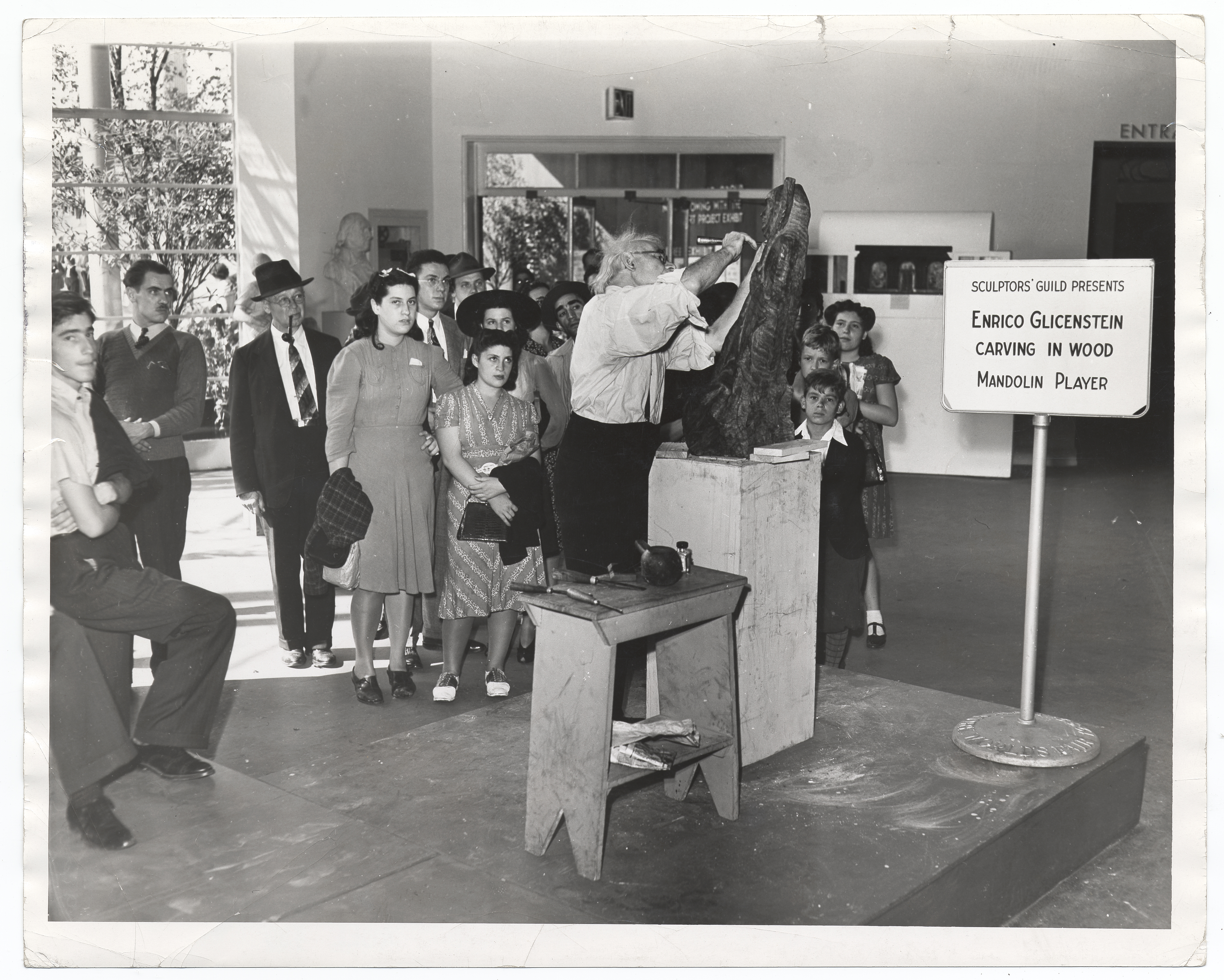
Enrico Glicenstein at work carving "Mandolin Player" in 1940. The sign reads: "Sculptors Guild Presents / Enrico Glicenstein / Carving in wood / 'Mandolin Player'." He was a Sculptors Guild founding member. Archives of American Art.

The Sculptors Guild continues today as an advocacy organization with a diverse membership. Activities have expanded to include the annual "dressing" of the windows of Saks Fifth Avenue, New York City, and participation in exhibitions abroad, such as the 1993 exhibition in Kyoto, Japan, and the 2008 international art fairs at Art Cologne and Supermarket Stockholm. In 2010 the Sculptors Guild opened a gallery space and office on the second floor in Dumbo, Brooklyn. In September 2016, they moved into an office space on the second floor at the Renee and Chaim Gross Foundation, in Greenwich Village at 256 LaGuardia Place, New York, NY 10012 and continue to have summer exhibitions on Governors Island.

The Sculptors Guild has a presence on New York's historic Governors Island, with annual indoor and outdoor exhibitions, carving workshops and gallery talks. Governors Island opened to the public in 2003. It has been a destination to see modern and contemporary artwork. The Sculptors Guild has had the opportunity to exhibit here in a historic residential area instead of the usual "white box" museum or gallery setting. The Guild has also exhibited large-scale outdoor sculptures on Governors Island, which is more difficult in New York City. In 2015 Richard Timperio, owner of Sideshow Gallery in Brooklyn, curated Laws of Attraction. Sculptors Guild previously had curated exhibits here for seven consecutive years. In 2017 The Sculptors Guild celebrated its 80th anniversary with an exhibition on Governors Island, Currently 80 curated by John Yau. The Guild also had a 70th anniversary exhibition on Governors Island titled In Site.

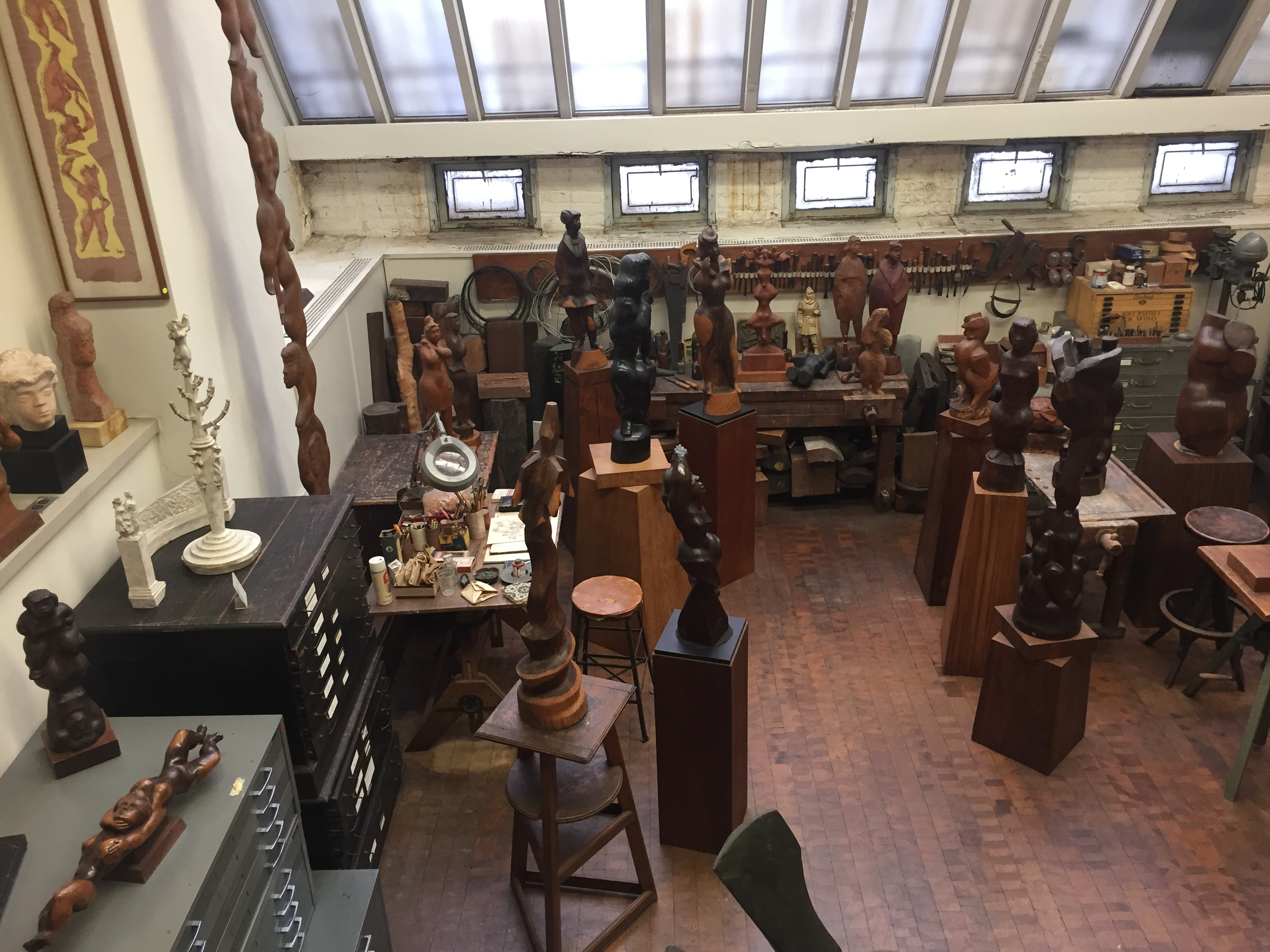
Chaim Gross Studio at Renee & Chaim Gross Foundation. He was a founder and the first President of the Sculptors Guild.

The Sculptors Guild also marked 80th Anniversary with another momentous member exhibition in February 2017. It was also curated by John Yau at the historic Westbeth Gallery at Westbeth Artists Community located in the West Village, New York City. This exhibition included both past and current members highlighting the vast forms of sculpture members have explored over past 80 years. A catalog with an essay by John Yau accompanied the exhibition.

The Guild's annual exhibitions have often taken place outdoors. Sculpture of Freedom was the fourth group exhibition of the Sculptor's Guild held in 1942 on a roof terrace at Rockefeller Center overlooking St. Patrick's Cathedral in Midtown Manhattan. This was a pivotal time during World War II when the war began to turn in favor of the Allies. The purpose of the exhibit was "to aid and encourage the growth of cultural unity among all the peoples of the free world." A New York Times review highlighted the selection of artists from United States, Canada, Europe, and Latin America, and artwork by Henry Moore and Jacques Lipschitz. The sixth outdoor exhibit of about 100 sculptures was held June through September 1955 on the corner lot at Fifth Avenue and 89th Street in New York City. This lot adjoined the Guggenheim Museum which was located in a townhouse at that time. The exhibit was organized and curated by the Sculptors Guild, and the press release spoke of the artists landscaping and transforming the site into a miniature Versailles Garden.

== Founding members ==
The 58 founding members of the Sculptors Guild were:

- Saul Baizerman
- Aaron Ben-Shmuel
- Simone Brangier Boas
- Sonia Gordon Brown
- Harold Cash
- Albino Cavalito
- Cornellia Van A. Chapin
- Robert Cronbach
- Louise Cross
- John Cunningham
- Alice Decker
- Jose de Creeft
- Jean De Marco
- Jose de Rivera
- Hunt Diederich
- Alfeo Faggi
- Herbert Ferber
- Paul Fiene
- John Bernard Flannagan
- Hy Freilicher
- Mark Freidman
- Eugenie Gershoy
- Enrico Glicenstein
- Maurice Glickman
- Vincent Glinsky
- Aaron Goodelman
- Dorothea Greenbaum
- Chaim Gross (first President)
- Genevieve Karr Hamlin
- Minna Harkavy
- Alonzo Hauser
- Milton Hebald
- Milton Horn
- John Hovannes
- Margaret Brassler Kane
- Nathaniel Kaz
- Oronzio Maldarelli
- Paul Manship
- Berta Margoulies (first Secretary)
- Dina Melicov
- George Meyers
- David Michnick
- Ward Montague
- Hugo Robus
- Marion Sanford
- Hélène Sardeau
- Concetta Scaravaglione
- Louis Slobodkin
- Cesare Stea
- Mary Tarleton
- T. Trajan
- Polygnotos Vagis
- Marion Walton
- Nat Werner
- Anita Weschler (first Treasurer)
- Warren Wheelock
- Adolf Wolff
- Sreekumar Unnikrishnan
- William Zorach

Membership is by invitation and/or submission to the Admissions Committee.

== See also ==
- Category:Sculptors Guild members
