= Dorothea Greenbaum =

American sculptor

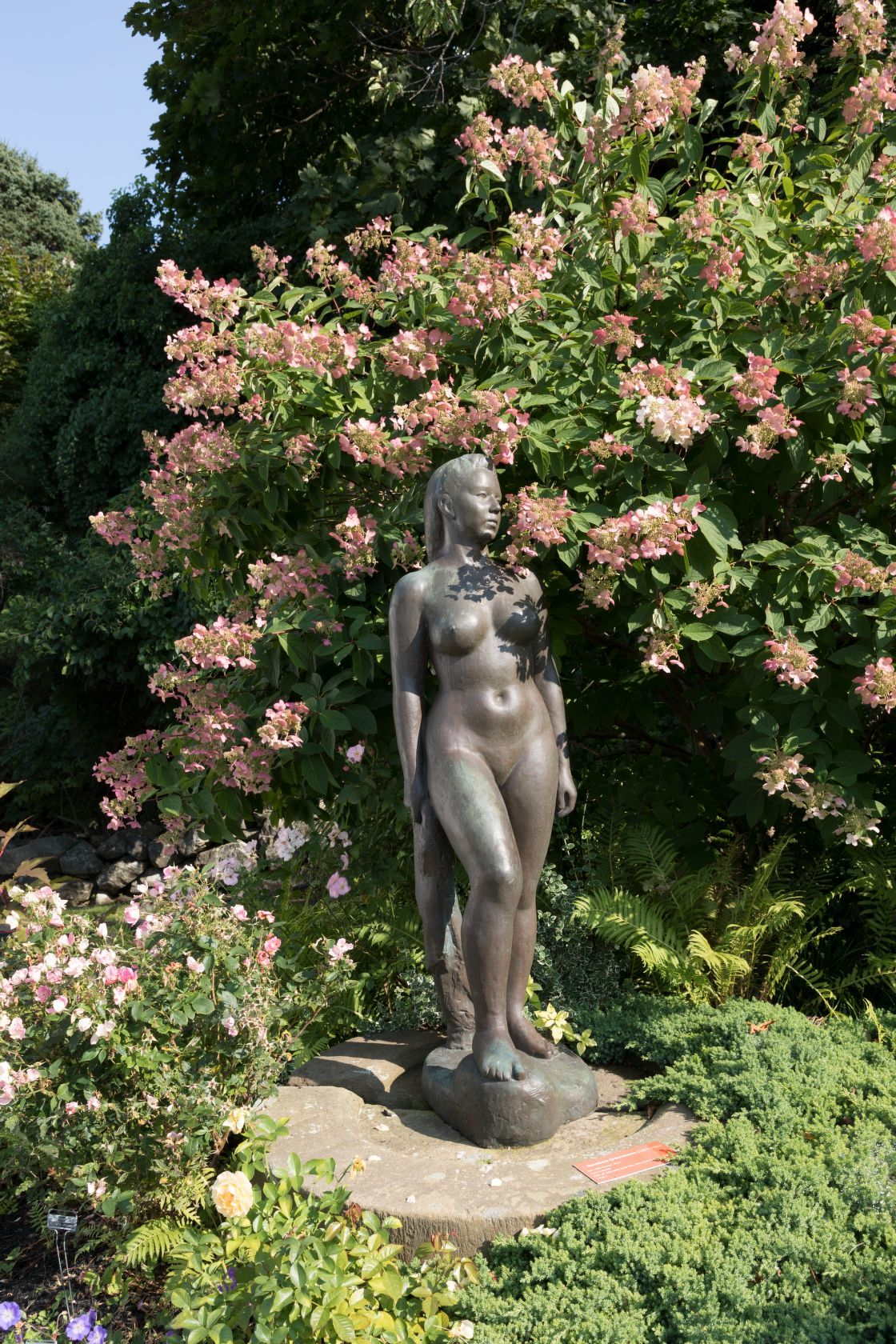
Girl with Towel (1967) by Dorothea Greenbaum

Dorothea Schwarcz Greenbaum (1893–1986) was an American painter and sculptor.

== Biography ==
She was born Dorothea Schwarcz to parents Emma and Maximilian Schwarcz in New York city on June 17, 1893. She studied at both the New York School of Fine and Applied Art and the Art Students League. In 1915, when Dorothea was 22, her father Maximilain drowned during the Sinking of the RMS Lusitania.

As a young child, Greenbaum was chronically ill and could not attend traditional school. This lead her to enroll in Saturday art classes at the age of fifteen. She studied under the painter, Kenneth Hayes Miller. She discovered sculpting while recovering from an illness later in life, after she was given a piece of clay by a friend. Nature was her inspiration for her sculptures, as well as children, women and animals.

Regarding her art, she was quoted in Dorothea Greenbaum: A Retrospective, Exhibition Catalogue, 1972 : “I am interested in forms that displace the air around them.”

She was included in the 1914 exhibition of the National Academy of Design. She was first painter, and began working in sculpture at the age of 34. In 1941 she received the George D. Widener Memorial Medal from the Pennsylvania Academy, and in 1953 she was given a medal of honor by the National Association of Women Artists. She was a member of the Sculptors Guild and was a founding member of New York Artists Equity Association in 1947.

She died in 1986 in Princeton, New Jersey. In 1972, a 45-year retrospective exhibition of her work was presented at the SculptureCenter, New York.

== Collections ==
Her work is included in the collections of:

- the Whitney Museum of American Art,
- the Institute for Advanced Study,
- the Princeton Art Museum,
- the Pennsylvania Academy of Fine Arts and
- the Smithsonian American Art Museum.
