= Herbert Gehr =

American photographer (1910–1983)

Herbert Gehr (later Edmund Bert Gerard) (1910–1983) was a Jewish German-American photographer and television director who was associated with Life magazine.

== Career ==
In the Spanish Civil War Gehr worked as a stills photographer before travelling to Egypt at the wars commencement where he shot newsreels for Wide World photos. With the advent of Nazism in his native Germany, Gehr moved to the United States in March 1937. Upon arrival in the United States, Gehr found representation with the Black Star photo agency, and began working for Life magazine in 1938, photographing a large variety of subjects and stories for them over the next few years. By 1940 Gehr had been described as having shot such diverse subjects as "sphinxes, hair ribbons, wars and movie stars" for the magazine.

Gehr left Life in 1950 and became a television director for ABC.

== Technique ==
Gehr's photographic style was renowned for his use of artificial light. Gehr once used twenty assistants to illuminate six blocks of Manhattan's Meatpacking District with flash bulbs, and in a photograph of the Great Sphinx of Giza taken for Life in 1938, he used the headlights of three cars to illuminate the scene, with an exposure time of three hours.

== Trial ==
In July 1950, shortly after leaving Life, Gehr accidentally shot his wife dead. In search of evidence of his adultery, Gehr's wife had unexpectedly arrived in the middle of the night at his country house near Brewster, New York with detectives, while Gehr was with his mistress. Mistaking the visitors for prowlers, his shooting also injured two of the four detectives present. His mistress leapt out of a window. Gehr was arrested and stood trial for second degree murder, and was acquitted. Gehr changed his name after the trial. At the conclusion of the case the jurors blamed Gehr's case on the divorce laws of New York state, as his wife had been seeking evidence for his adultery, which was required by law. Gehr resumed his work as a television director after his trial.

== Recognition ==
In 1955 Museum of Modern Art curator of photography Edward Steichen included one of Gehr's LIFE photographs in the world-touring The Family of Man exhibition, seen by 9 million visitors, and also in its widely distributed catalogue, which is still in print.

Gehr won three Emmy Awards before his 1983 death.

== See also ==
- 70 Sculptors, a 1949 Gehr photograph
