= Abbo Ostrowsky =

American artist (1889–1975)

Abbo Ostrowsky (October 23, 1889 Elizavetgrad, Russia – June 19, 1975) was an American art teacher and etcher.

== Life ==
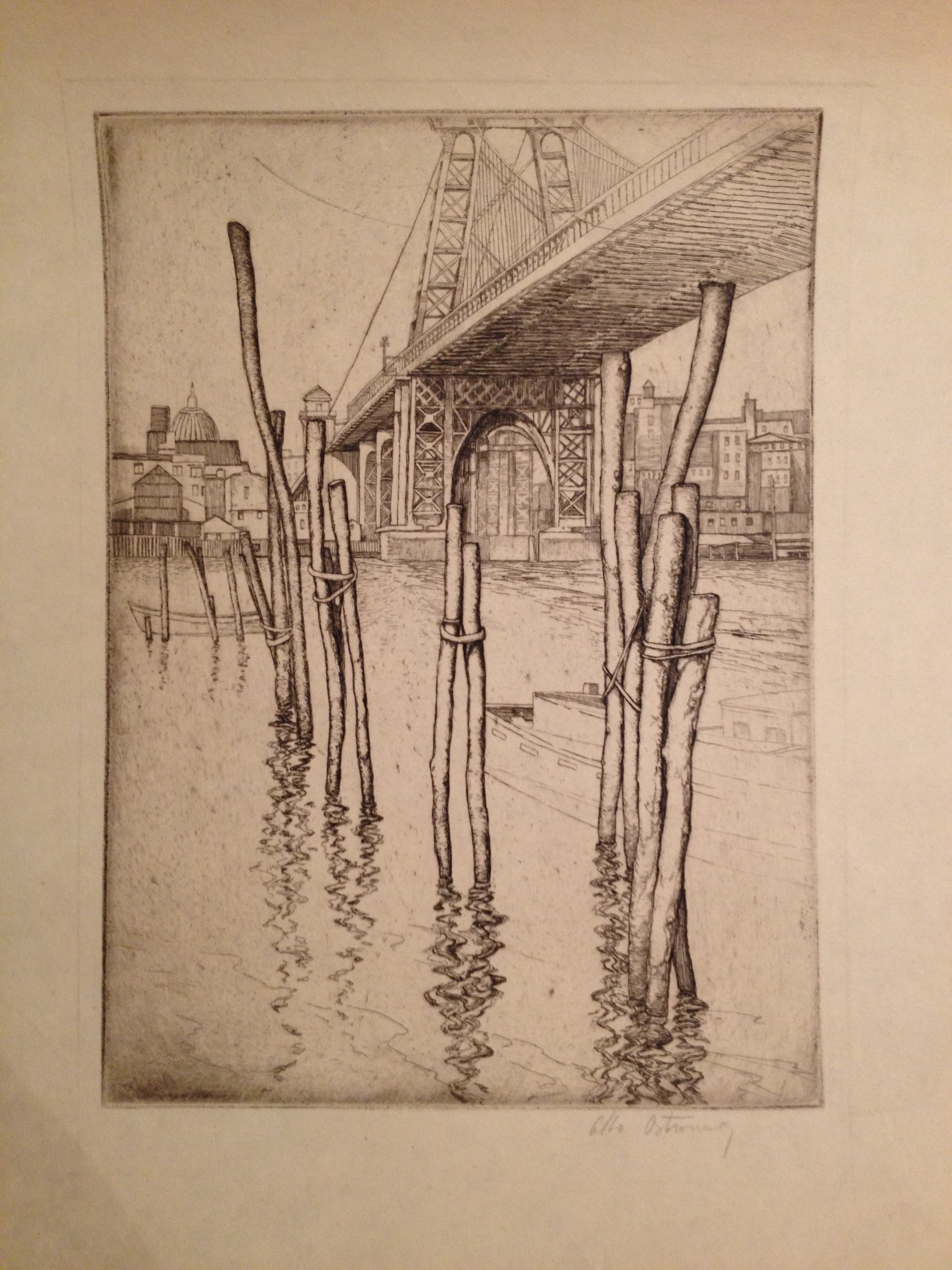
View of Brooklyn from under the Williamsburg Bridge, etching and drypoint, c.1930

Ostrowsky was born in the Russian Empire.

He studied at the Odessa Art School, with Kyriak Kostandi. In 1906, he was assistant director of People’s Art Traveling Exhibitions, in Ukraine. He immigrated to the United States in 1908. He studied at the National Academy of Design, with George Willoughby Maynard and Charles Yardley Turner. In 1914, he began art classes, at The Educational Alliance Art School. He retired in 1955.

His work appeared in Harper's. His art is in the collection of the Brooklyn Museum, and Smithsonian American Art Museum.

In 1954, his art collection was exhibited at the Jewish Museum. His papers are held at the YIVO Institute for Jewish Research, and Archives of American Art.
