= Sonia Gordon Brown =

Russian-American sculptor

Sonia Gordon Brown (Russian: Соня Гордон Браун)
- Sonia Gordon Brown
- Born: Sonia F. Rosental; January 11, 1890; Moscow, Russia
- Died: c. 1965
- Known for: Sculpture
- Spouse: William Gordon Brown

Sonia Gordon Brown (Russian: Соня Гордон Браун; January 11, 1890–c. 1965) was a Russian-American sculptor.

Sonia Gordon Brown, née Sonia F. Rosental, was born in Moscow, Russia on January 11, 1890. She studied in Russia, with Nikolay Andreyev and Valentin Serov, and later in Paris, with Antoine Bourdelle. She later moved to New York. Brown served as president of the New York Society of Women Artists in 1927.

Her work is included in the permanent collection of the Whitney Museum of Modern Art and the Provincetown Art Association and Museum.
