= Chaim Sheba =

Israeli physician and founder of Sheba Medical Center

- חיים שיבא
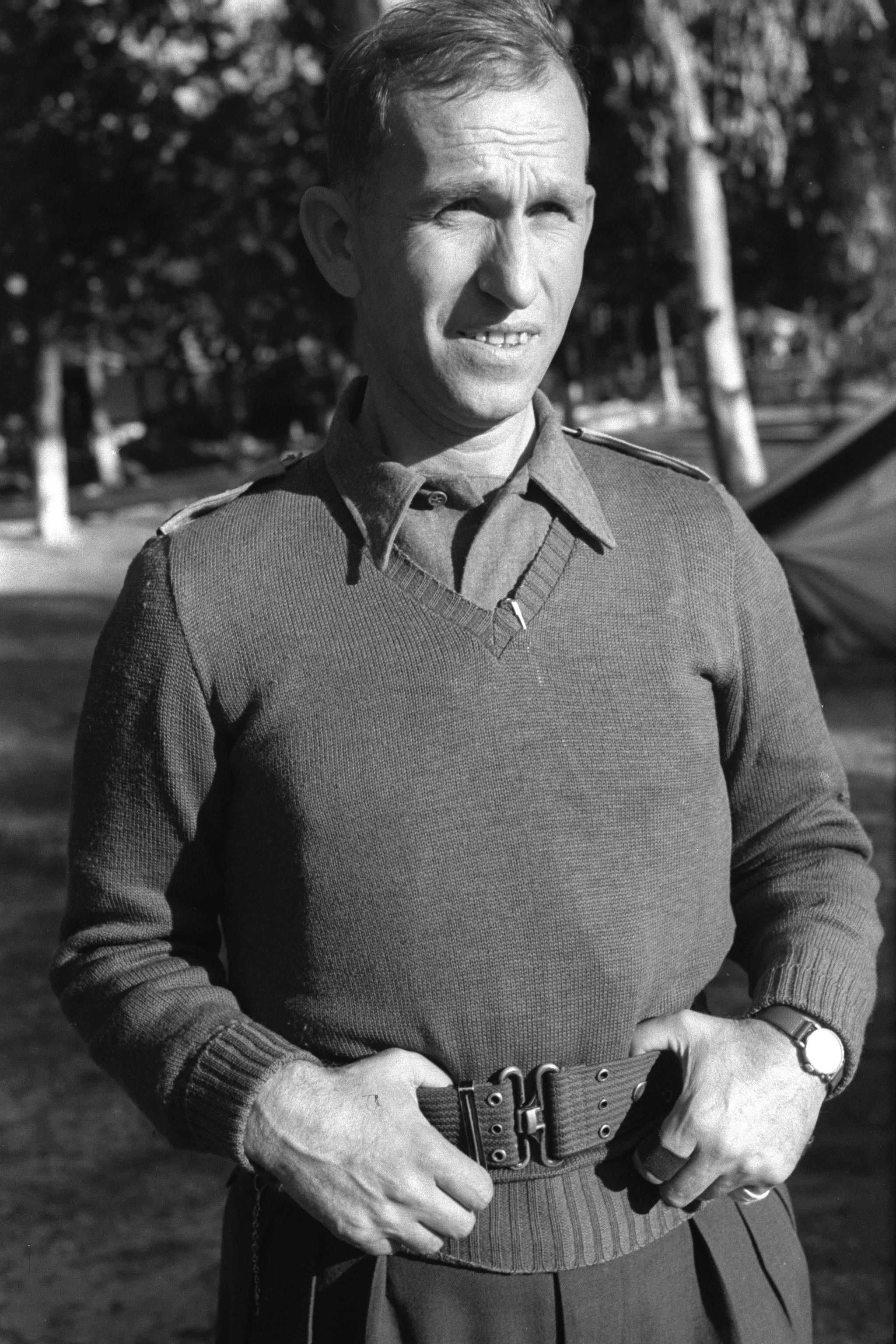
- Chaim Sheba, 1948
- Born: Chaim Scheiber; 1908; Frasin, Bukovina, Austria-Hungary (now Romania)
- Died: 10 July 1971 (aged 62–63)
- Education: University of Vienna
- Occupation: Physician
- Known for: Founder of Sheba Medical Center
- Awards: Israel Prize (1968, Medicine)

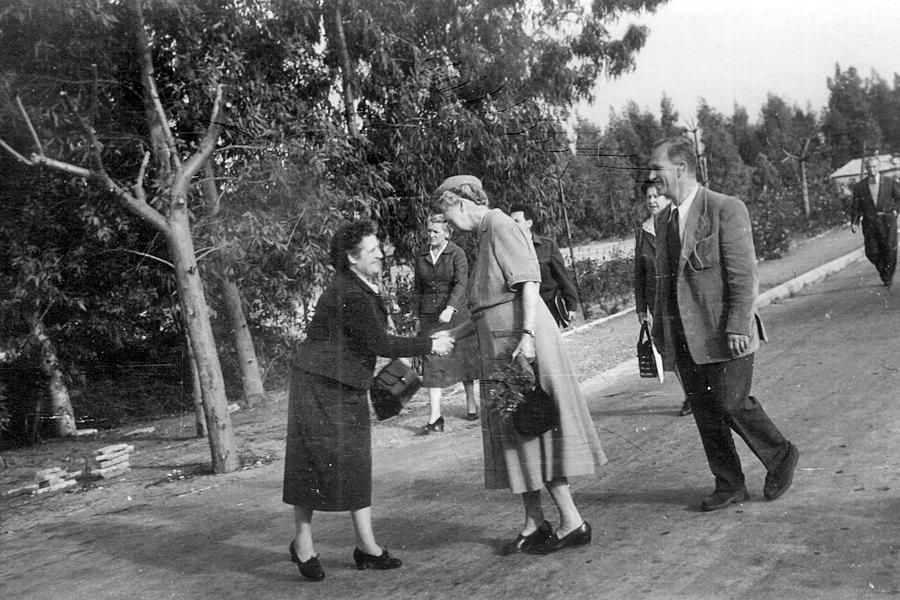
Chaim Sheba (right) escorts Eleanor Roosevelt during her visit to Sheba Medical Center

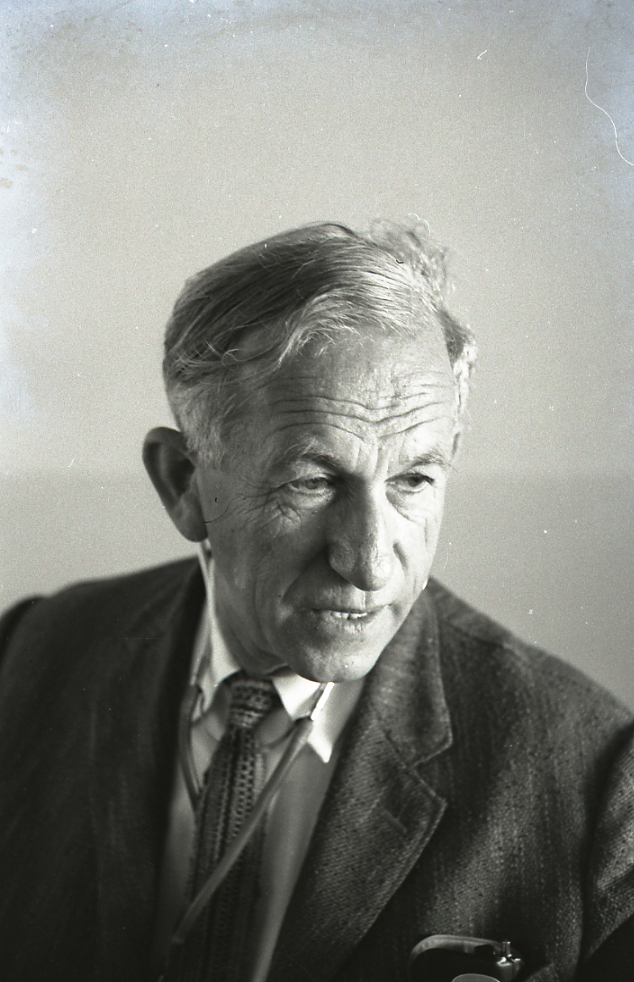
Sheba in 1967, photo by Boris Carmi, (Meitar collection, National Library of Israel)

Chaim Sheba (Hebrew: חיים שיבא; born 1908, died 10 July 1971) was an Israeli physician and the founder of Sheba Medical Center.

== Biography ==
Chaim Scheiber (later Sheba) was born in Frasin, near Gurahumora, Bukovina, then in Austria-Hungary (now Suceava County, Romania), to the well known Scheiber Hasidic family, a descendant of the Hasidic court of Ruzhin. As a young child he studied in heder, a school for religious studies only. He transferred from there to the 8th grade in a secular school. Influenced by his grandfather, he began medical studies, and he completed them in Vienna in December 1932. In 1933, Sheba immigrated to Mandate Palestine.

Sheba died in 1971 of a heart attack.

== Medical career ==
From 1933 to 1935, Sheba worked at HaEmek Medical Center. He moved to Kfar Vitkin in 1935, where he had a clinic and served as a rural doctor for the area. He also joined the Haganah that year. In 1936 he began working at Beilinson Hospital. In 1942, he enlisted in the British Army and served as a military doctor during World War II. From 1948 to 1950, he commanded the Medical Corps of the Israel Defense Forces (IDF), serving during the 1948 Arab-Israeli War, and became Director General of the Ministry of Health after leaving the IDF. He fulfilled this position until 1953, when he moved on to become the director of the Tel HaShomer Hospital (today Chaim Sheba Medical Center, named in his honor).

Sheba was involved in found the medical school at Hebrew University, and is described in some sources as having served as Professor of Medicine at the Hebrew University of Jerusalem. He was one of the founders of the Tel Aviv University Medical School and served as a Vice-President of that University. He also helped to establish medical schools in Jerusalem and in Haifa.

== Awards and recognition ==
In 1968, Sheba was awarded the Israel Prize, in medicine.

== See also ==
- List of Israel Prize recipients
- Health care in Israel
