= Concetta Scaravaglione =

American sculptor

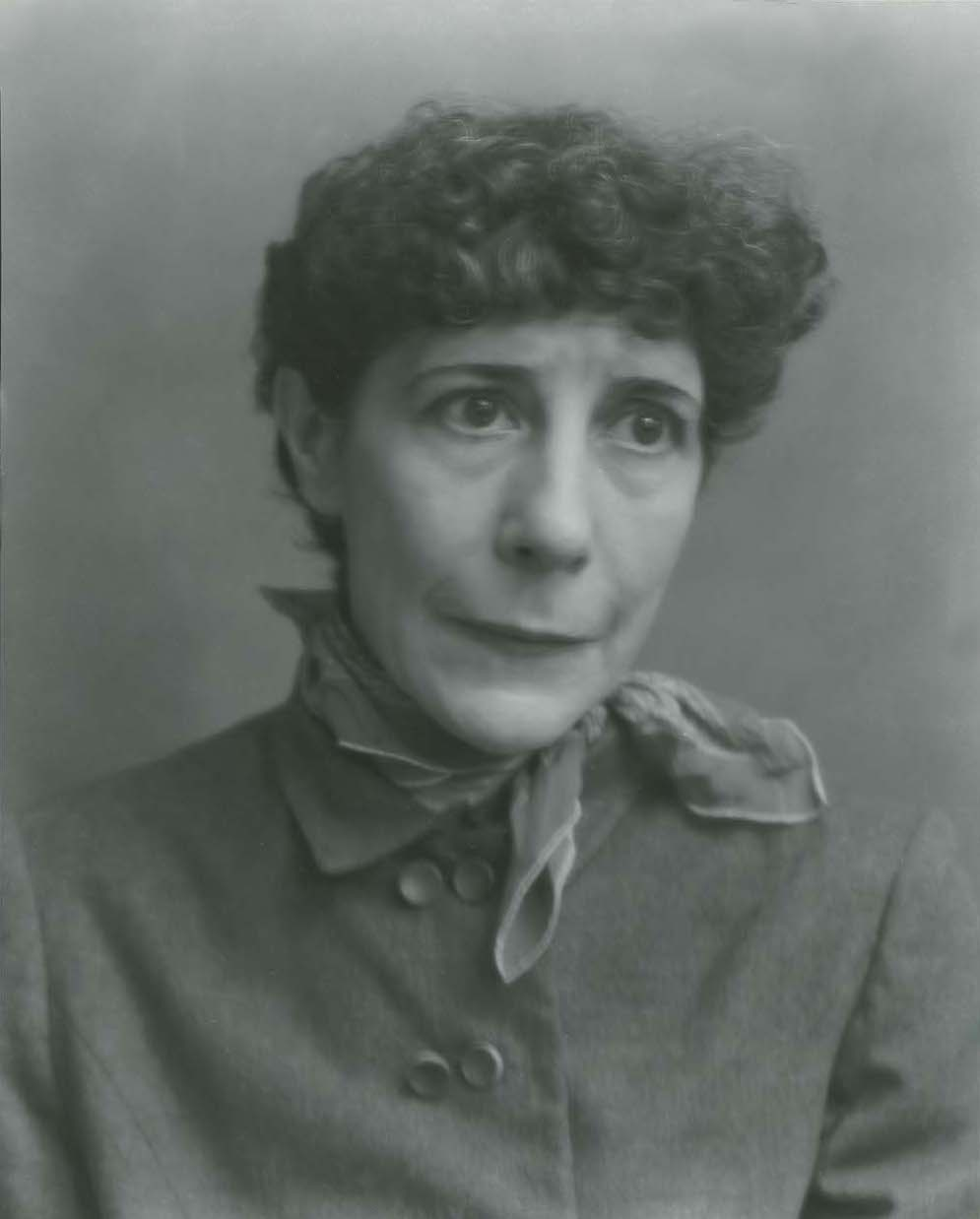
- Born: July 9, 1900; New York City, US
- Died: September 4, 1975 (aged 75); New York City, US

Railway Mail Carrier, 1862, aluminum cast 1936, today in the William Jefferson Clinton Federal Building

Concetta Maria Scaravaglione (July 9, 1900 – September 4, 1975) was an American sculptor. Her parents immigrated from Calabria, Italy, and Concetta was the youngest of nine children. She is known for her monumental figurative sculpture, her work for the Federal Art Project (FAP), and her teaching career. In 1946, she received a grant from the American Academy of Arts and Letters, and in 1947, she was the first woman to receive the American Academy's Prix de Rome award in visual arts.

== Early life ==
Concetta Scaravaglione, like most artists, had to struggle with finances in order to fund her career. While she was young, her father died, leaving her mother with a small grocery store to manage on her own, with the help of the children. In public school, her teacher Cecelia Holmand saw her artistic talent and encouraged her to pursue art as a career. Scaravaglione then attended the tuition-free National Academy of Design in NY, up until her sculpture class was cancelled because there were no co-ed classes available, and the academy refused to offer a class for a solitary female student. She then went to work at a lampshade and a perfume factory to save up, until she was awarded a scholarship to attend the Art Students League. There, she studied with John Sloan, A. Stirling Calder, William Zorach and Boardman Robinson. In 1924, she received the Nicholas Roerich scholarship to study at the Masters Institute of Sculpture with Robert Laurent. Scaravaglione then spent the summer of 1928 in Oyster Bay, Long Island because she received the Lewis Comfort Tiffany grant.

== Midlife ==
Sometime after returning to New York City from the Tiffany estate, Scaravaglione began her teaching career at New York University. She briefly took a trip to Rome and explored other parts of Europe before returning to the United States. She expanded her teaching career by including assignments at Black Mountain College and Sarah Lawrence College. She took another break from teaching, to focus on her artwork. Scaravaglione eventually returned to teaching in 1952 at Vassar College.

Throughout her teaching career, and subsequent breaks, Scaravaglione's professional art career took off. In 1926, she was elected to be a member of the New York Society of Women Artists and produced a wooden sculpture titled "The Bathers." In 1930, she participated in the Museum of Modern Art's exhibition entitled, "46 Painters and Sculptors Under 35 Years of Age." Her work, "Mother and Child" won the Widener Gold Medal from the Pennsylvania Academy of Fine Arts in 1934. In the meantime, she was hired by the Works Progress Administration (WPA) in the Federal Art Projects (FAP). Due to her association with the WPA and FAP, Concetta Scaravaglione was one of twelve sculptors chosen to receive a commission for the Treasury Section of Painting and Sculpture. Under this commission, Scaravaglione made four works: "Railway Mail Carrier, 1862", an aluminum figure located at the Post Office Department; "Agriculture," a limestone relief at the Federal Trade Commission; "Woman with Mountain Sheep," a large plaster figure at the Federal Building for the New York World's Fair; and "Aborigines," a wood carving relief for the Drexel Hill Post Office in Pennsylvania.

In 1937, Scaravaglione joined the Architect, Painters, and Sculptors Collaborative. This group was mostly made up of other Federal Arts Project artists who were encouraged to create works for public housing, hospitals, and other public spaces. This same year she became one of the founding members of the Sculptors Guild. The Guild held their own show in 1938 with roughly 39,000 visitors in attendance. Scaravaglione had entered her sculpture "Girl with Gazelle" in the show, which received recognition on the covers of both Newsweek and Art Digest.

== Later life ==
In 1947, Concetta Scaravaglione won the Prix de Rome award from the American Academy in Rome, which made her the first woman to ever be awarded that honor. This award included transportation to and residence in the American Academy in Rome, studio space, and a $1,250 stipend per year, which she received each year from 1947 to 1950.

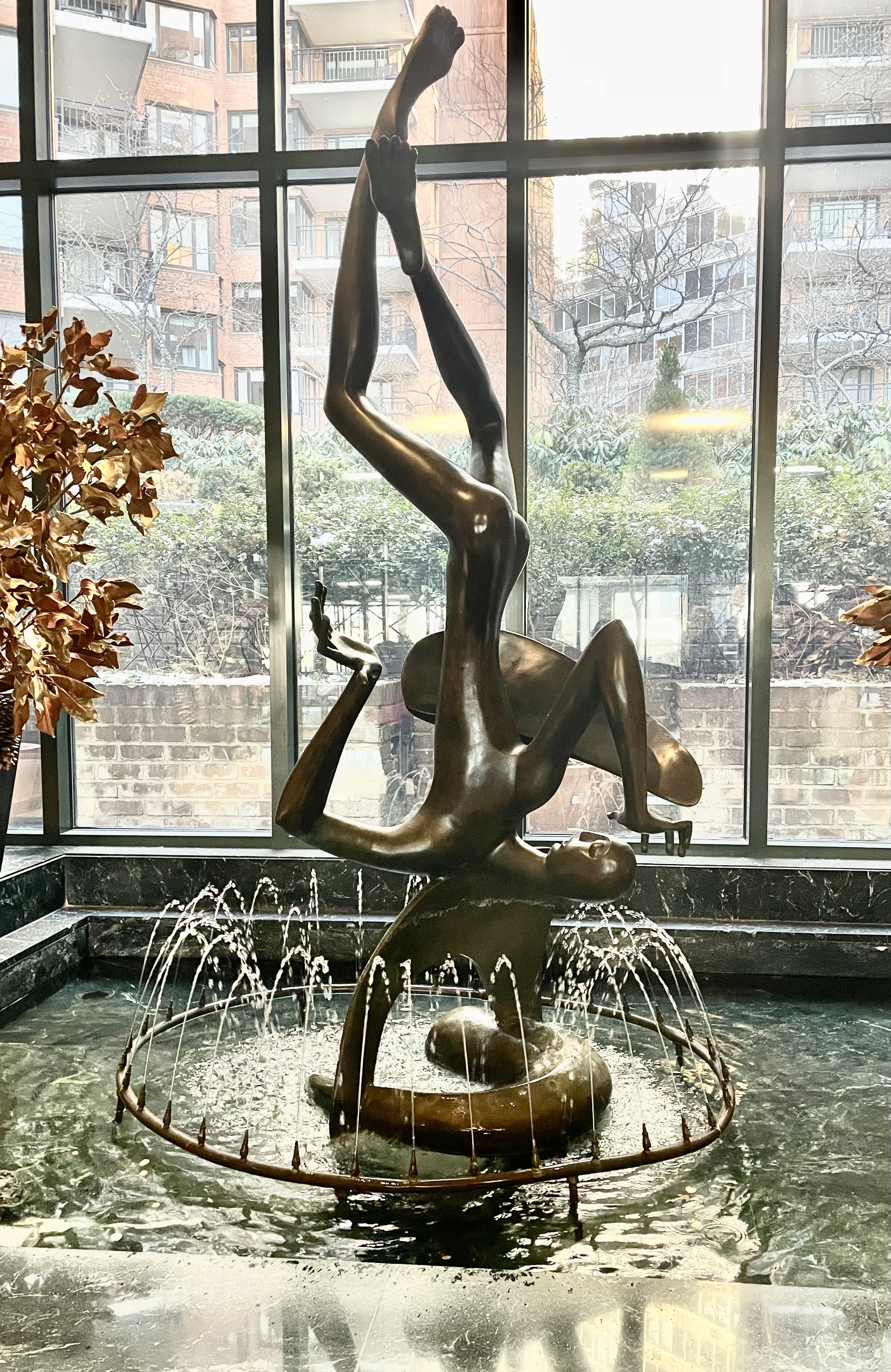
Icarus, bronze sculpture, now in 60 Sutton Place lobby

During this time in Rome, Scaravaglione created "Icarus." Her inspiration for the piece was the poem "Icaro" by Lauro de Bosis, the Italian aviator and anti-fascist. "Icarus" was greeted with equally opposing opinions. Critics claimed the piece was too stylized in comparison to her previous works, whereas fans thought of it as a masterpiece. "Icarus," first seen in Rome, then housed at the Tishman Building, is now exhibited in the lobby of 60 Sutton Place in New York City.

After returning to the United States, Scaravaglione was hired in 1952 as a part-time faculty at Vassar College where she taught sculpture until she retired in 1967. She continued to sculpt and carve, and when she "found carving too confining for her total artistic expression," she began exploring the technique of welding metal to construct her figures. Concetta Scaravaglione died in 1975 in New York City after a long bout with cancer.

== Selected work ==
- Vincent Canade, 1927, Museum of Modern Art, New York, New York
- Railway Mail Carrier 1862, 1936, Ariel Rios Federal Building, Washington District of Columbia
- Americans at Work, Past and Present: Agriculture, 1938, Federal Trade Commission Building, Washington District of Columbia
- Girl with Faun, 1938–1940, William Cullen Bryant High School, Queens, New York
- Bird, 1952-1953 Arizona State University, University Art Museum, Tempe, Arizona
- Angel, 1962, Vassar College, Frances Lehman Loeb Art Center, Poughkeepsie, New York
- Mother and Child, by 941, Virginia Museum of Fine Arts, Richmond, Virginia
- Seated Girl, 1939, Pennsylvania Academy of the Fine Arts, Philadelphia, Pennsylvania
- Seated Woman with a Guitar, n.d, Cincinnati Art Museum, Cincinnati, Ohio
- Standing Female Nude (Sculpture),1939, Smithsonian American Art Museum, Washington, District of Columbia

== Principal exhibitions and shows ==
1930 Museum of Modern Art Exhibition, "46 Painters and Sculptors under 35 years of age"

1933 Fairmount Park Art Association Show

1934 Mayor LaGuardia-sponsored First Municipal Art Exhibition

1938 Federal Art Project Outdoor Sculpture Show

1941 Virginia Museum of Art, Solo Exhibition

1964 World's Fair, NY

1967 Vassar Art Gallery Show, Solo Exhibition

1972 Kraushaar Galleries, NY, Solo Exhibition
