= Indian Hunter (disambiguation) =

"The Indian Hunter" is an 1842 song.

Indian Hunter may also refer to:

- Indian Hunter (Manship), a sculpture by Paul Manship
- Indian Hunter (Ward), a sculpture by Quincy Adams Ward
