= The Flight of Europa =

1925 bronze sculpture by Paul Manship

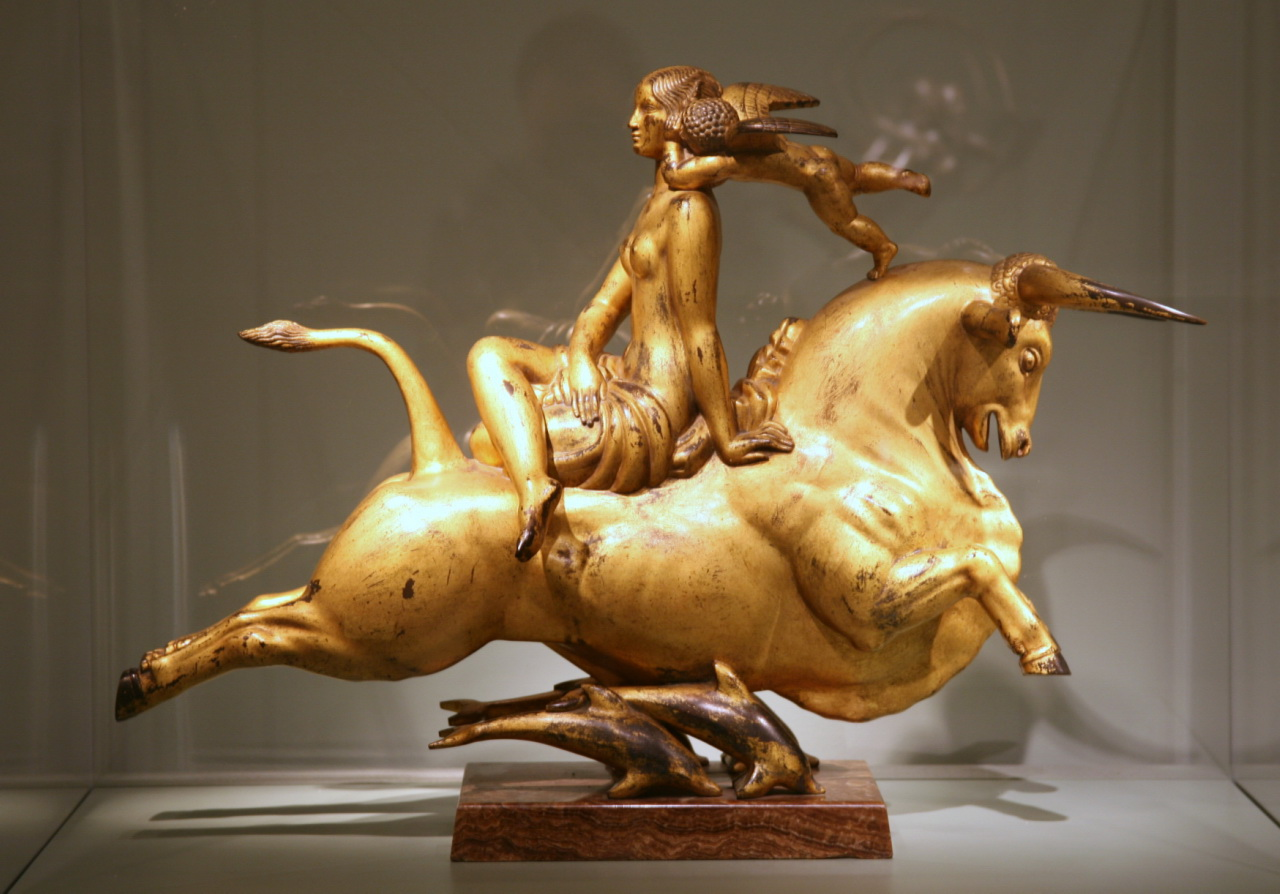
- Sculpture in 2008
- Artist: Paul Manship
- Year: 1925
- Type: Bronze sculpture
- Dimensions: 64 cm × 21.0 cm × 77 cm (25 in × 8.25 in × 30.5 in)

The Flight of Europa is a bronze Art Deco sculpture created by American artist Paul Manship in 1925. Copies are held by the Indianapolis Museum of Art, the Los Angeles County Museum of Art, The Columbus Museum, Columbus, Georgia, and the Smithsonian American Art Museum. It depicts the Greek myth of Europa being abducted by Zeus in the form of a bull.

== Description ==
The Flight of Europa is an elegant and modern depiction of an ancient act of violation. The strong diagonals make even the massive bull seem to float. Europa herself sits calmly, legs crossed, as Cupid whispers in her ear. Inspired by murals he saw in Crete, Manship added dolphins under the bull to represent the couples' destination. The delicate linear detailing that became Manship's hallmark can be seen in her hair, Zeus' mane, and Cupid's wings. Without the base, the statue stands 20.75 in (52.7 cm).) tall. At least one copy has "P. MaNSHIP ©" inscribed on the base. The statue is bronze, though some copies have been gilded, and they stand on stone bases of agate, marble, or onyx.

== Historical information ==
Inspired by a Titian portrait of Europa, Manship created a trio of sculptures about that myth, of which this is the last and most elaborate. They were part of a series of sculptures he created in Paris in the early 1920s that earned him wide acceptance as a serious force in contemporary art. The early appreciation for archaic Greek sculpture he had acquired during his fellowship in Rome combined with his recent anatomy studies with Solon Borglum, enabling him to create a balance between realistic and formal elements. Manship was very fond of his Europa sculptures and often gave souvenir copies to friends. A copy was recently sold at auction for $458,500.

=== Acquisition ===
Manship gave one copy directly to the Smithsonian. Four other casts have been located. The Columbus Museum's copy was the last to be acquired by a public institution. It had originally been given to artist Leon Kroll, and a letter from Manship to Kroll describing the gift is held at the Archives of American Art. LACMA's copy had originally been given to Manship's supporters Edwin and Sarah Holter, and their descendants cherished it for 70 years until the generosity of the American Art Council and the Shirley Filiatrault Trust helped LACMA acquire it in 1998. The IMA received its copy in 1950 as a gift of Lucy M. Taggart in memory of her brother Thomas D. Taggart.

== See also ==
- Minoan civilization
- Celestial Sphere Woodrow Wilson Memorial
