= Woodrow Wilson Foundation =

US non-profit organization

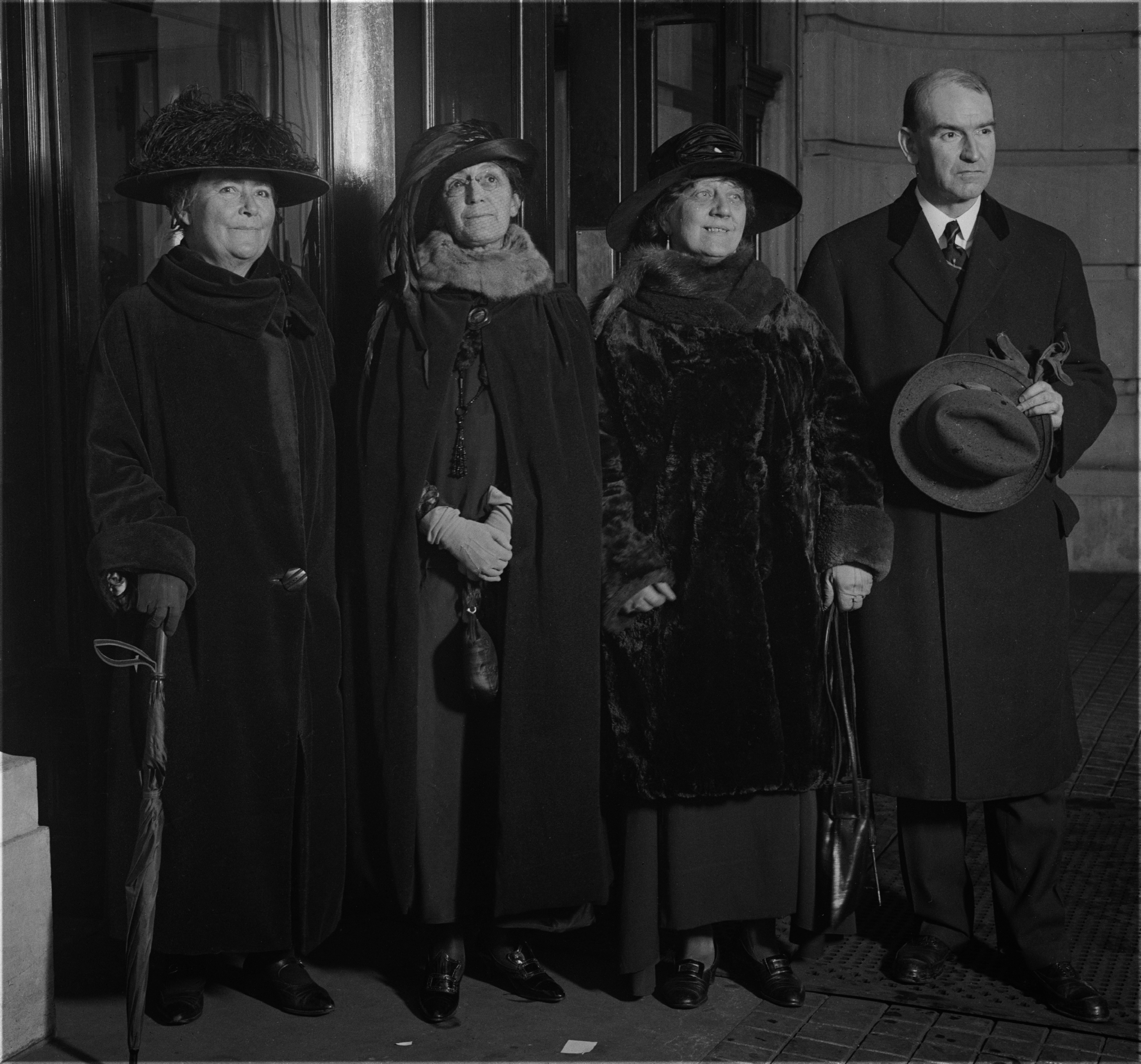
Leading members of the Woodrow Wilson Foundation calling upon Wilson at his home in 1923: (L-R) Rose Davney Forbes, Boston; Mrs. Charles E. Simonson, New York; Caroline Rautz-Rees, Greenwich, CT; and Hamilton Holt, New York, chair.

The Woodrow Wilson Foundation was an educational non-profit created in 1921, organized under the laws of New York, for the "perpetuation of Wilson's ideals" via periodic grants to worthy groups and individuals. Franklin D. Roosevelt was the chair of the group's governing National Committee, coordinating fundraising activity of parallel groups in each of the 48 states.

The group sought to gather a $1 million endowment fund, the interest on which was to pay for the group's cash awards. A national fundraising drive to raise the endowment was launched on January 16, 1922, but despite extensive organization and relentless publicity only half the financial target was raised by February 15. With its medal and endowment to allow for annual financial prizes, the Woodrow Wilson Foundation in its initial iteration resembled the Nobel Foundation and its Nobel Prizes, albeit on a smaller financial scale.

Beginning in 1963 the Woodrow Wilson Foundation financed publication of Wilson's collected works and related documents, a 69-volume series entitled The Papers of Woodrow Wilson. The difficulty and expense of this nearly 30-year project drained the energy and finances of the organization, which was terminated in 1993 — one year before completion of the Wilson Papers project.

== Organizational history ==
=== Establishment ===
The original idea for establishment of an endowed fund to make financial awards to individuals and groups best advancing the ideals of Wilsonianism was credited to Mrs. Charles E. Simonson of New York, who was previously active in a women's group called the Political Equality Club of Richmond County. The fund was envisioned as a way to make permanent the memory and legacy of Woodrow Wilson, President of the United States from 1913 to 1920.

The Woodrow Wilson Foundation was provisionally established on December 23, 1920, with formal organization completed at a meeting held in New York City on March 15, 1921. The organization was established independently of former President Woodrow Wilson but named in his honor by organizers, who pointed to Wilson having "further the cause of human freedom" and for having been "instrumental in pointing out effective methods for the cooperation of the liberal forces of mankind throughout the world."

Organizers planned on raising funds in order to make cash awards to help support the world of individuals and groups that had rendered "meritorious service to democracy, public welfare, liberal thought, or peace through justice." It was hoped to raise $1 million to endow the foundation. Based upon prevailing interest rates of the day, it was reckoned that a $1 million endowment would generate about $50,000 in interest each year in perpetuity, enabling annual awards in that amount.

=== Structure ===
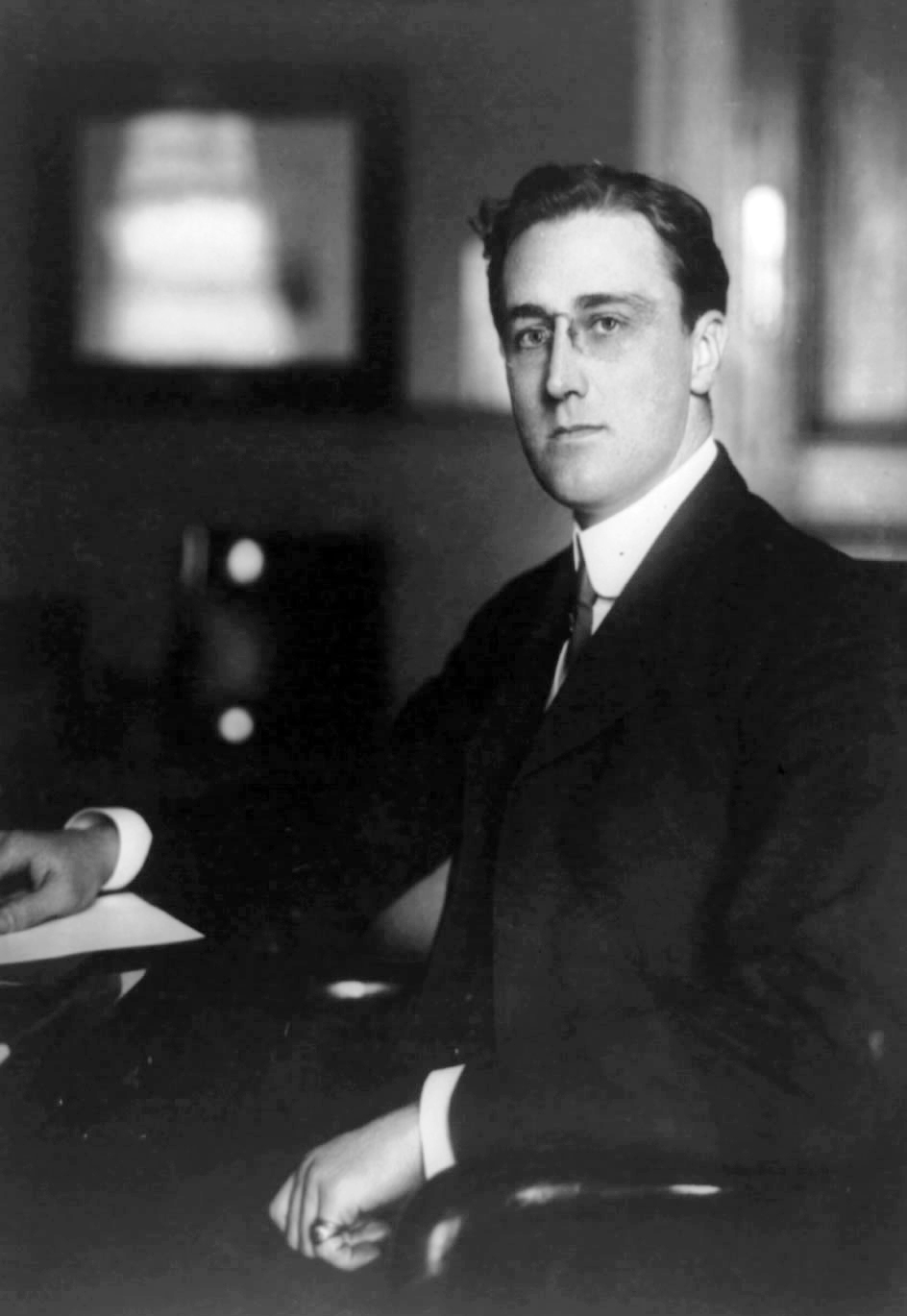
Franklin D. Roosevelt, shown here in 1913 as a young cabinet official in the Wilson administration, was Chairman of the National Committee of the Woodrow Wilson Foundation.

Chairman of the National Committee of the Wilson Foundation from 1921 was former Assistant Secretary of the Navy and future President of the United States Franklin D. Roosevelt. Roosevelt asserted that by donating to the endowment fund of the Wilson Foundation, "the American people will be given and opportunity to express their appreciation of Mr. Wilson's services to humanity."

Executive Director of the fund at the time of its establishment was editor of the internationalist news magazine The Independent, Hamilton Holt. Financier Cleveland H. Dodge was named the chair of the provisional executive committee. The temporary Executive Committee included nine other members, three of whom were close Wilson adviser Edward M. House, American representative to the Paris Peace Conference Frank Polk, and the wife of publishing mogul Malcolm Forbes. Other prominent supporters of the project included businessman and former ambassador Henry Morgenthau, Sr. and Adolph Ochs, publisher of the New York Times.

The Woodrow Wilson Foundation was based in New York City, with its national office located at 150 Nassau Street. The organization was formally governed by a National Committee, consisting of more than 250 representatives from each state, which elected in turn a National Executive Committee to handle the day-to-day operations of the organization.

During the main fundraising campaign to build the organization's endowment fund, which launched in October 1921, the Wilson Foundation named chairs for each state to coordinate fundraising activities on a state basis. These, in turn, named county chairs to help localize fundraising activity. This system was roughly analogous to the wartime sales of Liberty bonds, which made similar use of formal state and local officers to coordinate sales. By the end of September 1921, chair of the National Executive Committee Cleveland Dodge boasted that 37 of the 48 American states had been organized on such a basis. Three more states were organized in the first half of October, running the total to 40.

On December 2, 1921, a meeting of the National Committee was convened in New York City, including representatives from around the country. Chief on the agenda was the need to determine the mechanism for awarding the Foundation's prize awards. The National Committee also began the process of naming 15 permanent trustees of the Wilson Foundation's assets, recommending Franklin Roosevelt, Cleveland Dodge, feminist leader Carrie Chapman Catt, university president E. A. Alderman, and William Allen White of Kansas. The other 10 trustees were to be named later by the executive committee, the National Committee decided.

The 15 Trustees were to provide annual funds, generated through investment of the endowment in government securities, to a 25-member "Jury of Awards," the members of which were to serve 9-year terms.

=== 1922 endowment drive ===
Engraved certificate given by the Woodrow Wilson Foundation to donors to its 1922 endowment fund drive.

Plans were made for the gathering of "$1,000,000 or more" to provide a permanent endowment for the Wilson Foundation's prizes. Donors were to receive an attractive certificate in acknowledgment of their donations, with the motif determined through an artistic contest in the fall of 1921. Monday, January 16, 1922, was scheduled for the mass launch of the endowment-raising campaign.

In an event to generate a tidal wave of energy, enthusiasm, and publicity to start the fundraising campaign, even the January 16 date was more tightly focused, with the National Committee advising through the Wilson Foundation's official organ, The Foundation News Letter, that the hour of noon until 1 pm be declared "The Wilson Hour," in which all supporters of Wilson's ideas should show up in person at their local office of the Wilson Foundation to make donations in person.

In addition, the Wilson Foundation made use of newspaper advertising and planned a fundraising canvas in connection with its January 1922 endowment drive. Rather than a door-to-door drive, this canvas seems to have taken the form of volunteers from various organizations, frequently women, operating fundraising tables at banks, drug stores, and other well-trafficked places.

The Monday, January 16 focused fundraising event was to be preceded by mass meetings in major cities on Saturday, January 14, and by advocacy of the project by religious ministers speaking from the pulpit on what was deemed "Woodrow Wilson Sunday," January 15. Both of these tactics — the use of fundraising rallies and coordination of fundraising through Sunday sermons by friendly ministers — were revisitations to tried-and-true methods used in generating funds for the Liberty Loans during wartime.

Despite planning for a mass launch of fundraising activities, funds were already being raised by the various state organizations by December 1921, with temporary receipts being provisionally provided until the engraved certificates for donors were ready for distribution the following month.

The organization took pains to emphasize that operation costs of the organization were previously covered by supporters of the project and that "every dollar received by the National Treasurer" in the January 1922 endowment drive was to be put towards the endowment for the Wilson Foundation's awards.

State and local fundraising quotas were set and "canvassing" continued throughout the month of January and into February as funds slowly rolled in. The drive seems to have begun to run out of steam late in February 1922, with many locales failing to meet their fundraising targets and the national fundraising effort coming up far short of its $1 million goal. On February 11 the Foundation's official News Letter announced that Oklahoma had thus far led all states with fulfillment of 67% of its financial target; an optimistic spin was placed on the ongoing fundraising effort, which was characterized as just launching at that late date in some localities.

The halfway point in fundraising was only reached on February 15, 1922, National Committee chair Franklin D. Roosevelt announced. The second month of fundraising had only brought the endowment to $660,000, with no state exceeding 82% of its fundraising quota. By the end of 1922, only $800,000 had been raised.

=== Awards ===
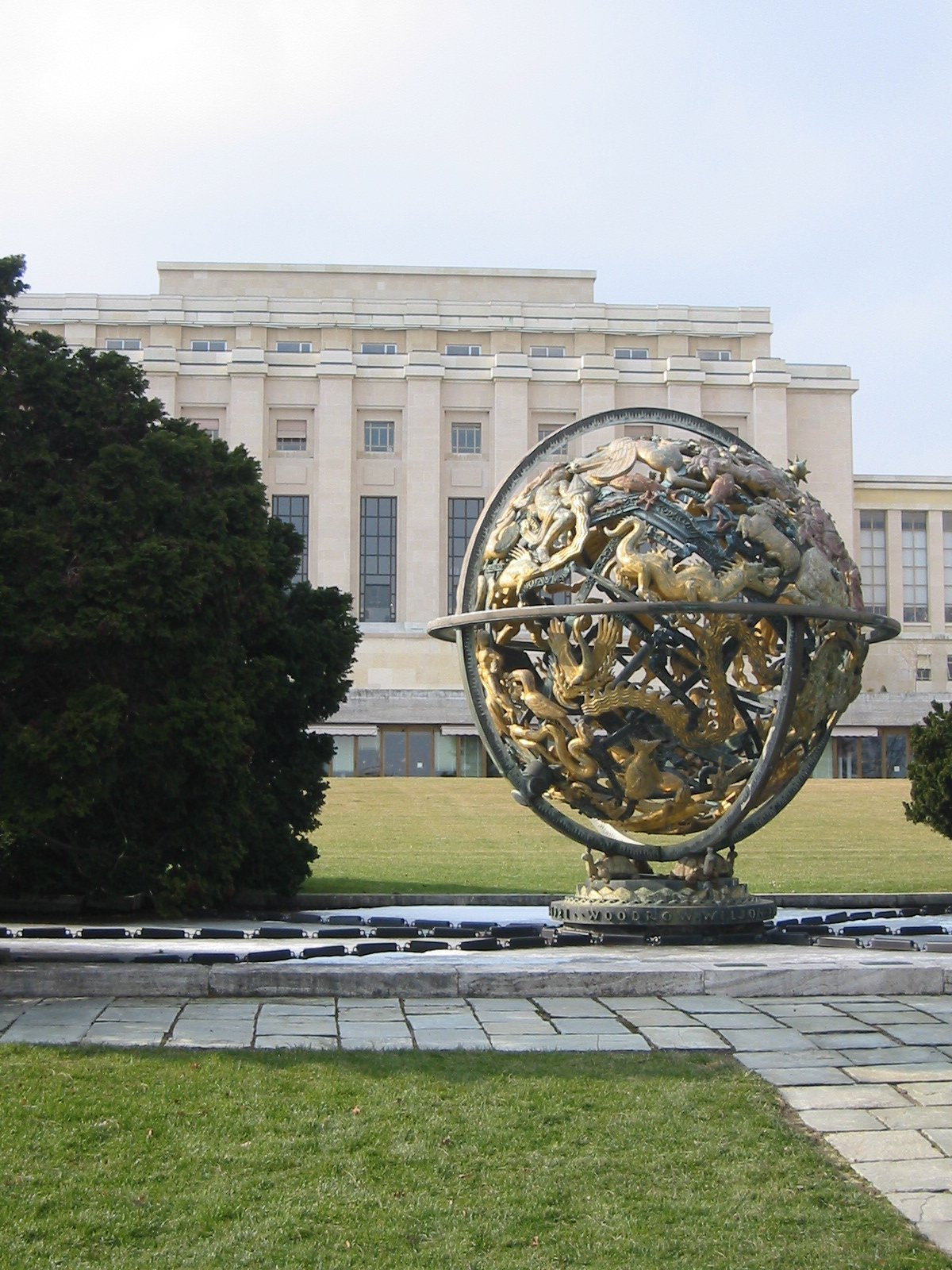
The Celestial Sphere Woodrow Wilson Memorial, by Paul Manship, presented in 1939 to the League of Nations by the Woodrow Wilson Foundation and installed in Geneva.

On April 16, 1922, Frank L. Polk announced on behalf of the Woodrow Wilson Foundation that the organization would make its awards internationally, not limiting prize winners to Americans. It would remain to the 15-member board of trustees to determine the size and frequency of such awards, Polk noted.

An awards jury of 9 was decided upon late in 1923, headed by the elderly former President of Harvard College, Charles William Eliot. Owing to the failure of the fund to achieve its $1 million target, awards of $25,000 were declared for the first three years — somewhat less than the estimated $27,000 in interest revenue generated by the endowment. Nominations were to remain open until June 1, with the award made in conjunction with the December 28th birthday of Wilson.

Prizes were to be granted to individuals, not organizations, it was decided, with "unselfish public service of enduring virtue" held to be the chief qualification of award recipients.

The Wilson Foundation made its first award, a bronze medal 12 inches in diameter and a cash award of $25,000, in the fall of 1924 to Robert Cecil — a British architect of the League of Nations. With its medal and endowment to allow for annual financial prizes, the Woodrow Wilson Foundation in its initial iteration resembled the Nobel Foundation and its Nobel Prizes, albeit on a smaller financial scale. The choice of Cecil was editorially lauded by the Brooklyn Daily Eagle, which called the British statesman a man who had "labored arduously and unselfishly for the realization of Mr. Wilson's ideals."

Although approximately 1,000 people gathered at the Hotel Astor in Manhattan for the annual banquet of the Woodrow Wilson Foundation to eulogize the late President on what would have been his 69th birthday in December 1925, no prize was granted in that year owing to a failure of the award jury to agree upon a worthy candidate.

A second medal and $25,000 award was made in 1926 to former Senator, Republican Secretary of State, and 1912 Nobel Peace Prize winner Elihu Root. Root was recognized for his advocacy of American entry into the League of Nations — regarded by the decision-makers of the Wilson Foundation as a fundamental principle of Wilsonian internationalism. Root promptly signed over his prize check to the fledgling magazine Foreign Affairs, which was itself attempting to build an endowment fund to insure its longterm survival.

A special donation made possible an essay contest in 1927, in which a pair of $25,000 prizes were offered to female and male authors for the best work on the theme "What Woodrow Wilson Means To Me." The lucrative essay competition was to be opened to anyone between the ages of 20 and 30, with submissions to close on October 1. Once again the prize jury could not agree, however, and no $25,000 first prizes or $1,000 second prizes were granted; instead 14 "third prizes" of $100 were paid, a tiny fraction of the purported prize pool. No other medal or award was granted in that year.

In 1928 the Wilson Foundation presented its medal and a $25,000 prize to aviator Charles Lindbergh, ostensibly for his "contributions to international friendship." Ironically, Lindbergh would later become the face of a most un-Wilsonian isolationism in the 1930s. The following year the Wilson Foundation chose to honor the League of Nations, with the $25,000 prize expected to be used for the construction of a monument to President Wilson at League headquarters in Geneva.

The organization continued to grant its "Woodrow Wilson Award for Distinguished Service" to deserving individuals annually, although whether there was a cash award connected to this honor is unclear.

In 1947, an award was created for the "best book on government, politics, or international affairs." It is today awarded by the American Political Science Association (APSA).

=== Final years and legacy ===
In 1963, the Foundation undertook the financial responsibility for the completion of The Papers of Woodrow Wilson, a 69-volume edition of all of Wilson's papers, which was jointly sponsored by Princeton University. Princeton housed Wilson's papers and provided the staff for the project. The first volume was published in 1966 and the final volume in 1994.

The Wilson Papers project consumed all of the energies and funds of the foundation during its thirty-year duration. Following the publication of the final volume, the foundation intended to return to its support of research, but the financial outlay proved to have been too great, and the foundation was terminated in 1993.

The papers of the Woodrow Wilson Foundation are housed in the archives of Princeton University in Princeton, New Jersey. They consist of 64 archival boxes of documents, primarily from the years 1921 to 1963.

== Woodrow Wilson Medal winners ==
- 1924: Robert Cecil
- 1925: No award given.
- 1926: Elihu Root
- 1927: No award given.
- 1928: Charles Lindbergh
- 1929: The League of Nations
- 1930: No award given.

== Publications ==
- David Loth, The Story of Woodrow Wilson. Revised edition. New York: Woodrow Wilson Foundation, 1957.
