= Celestial Sphere Woodrow Wilson Memorial =

Sculpture

Coordinates: 46.22609°N 6.14223°E

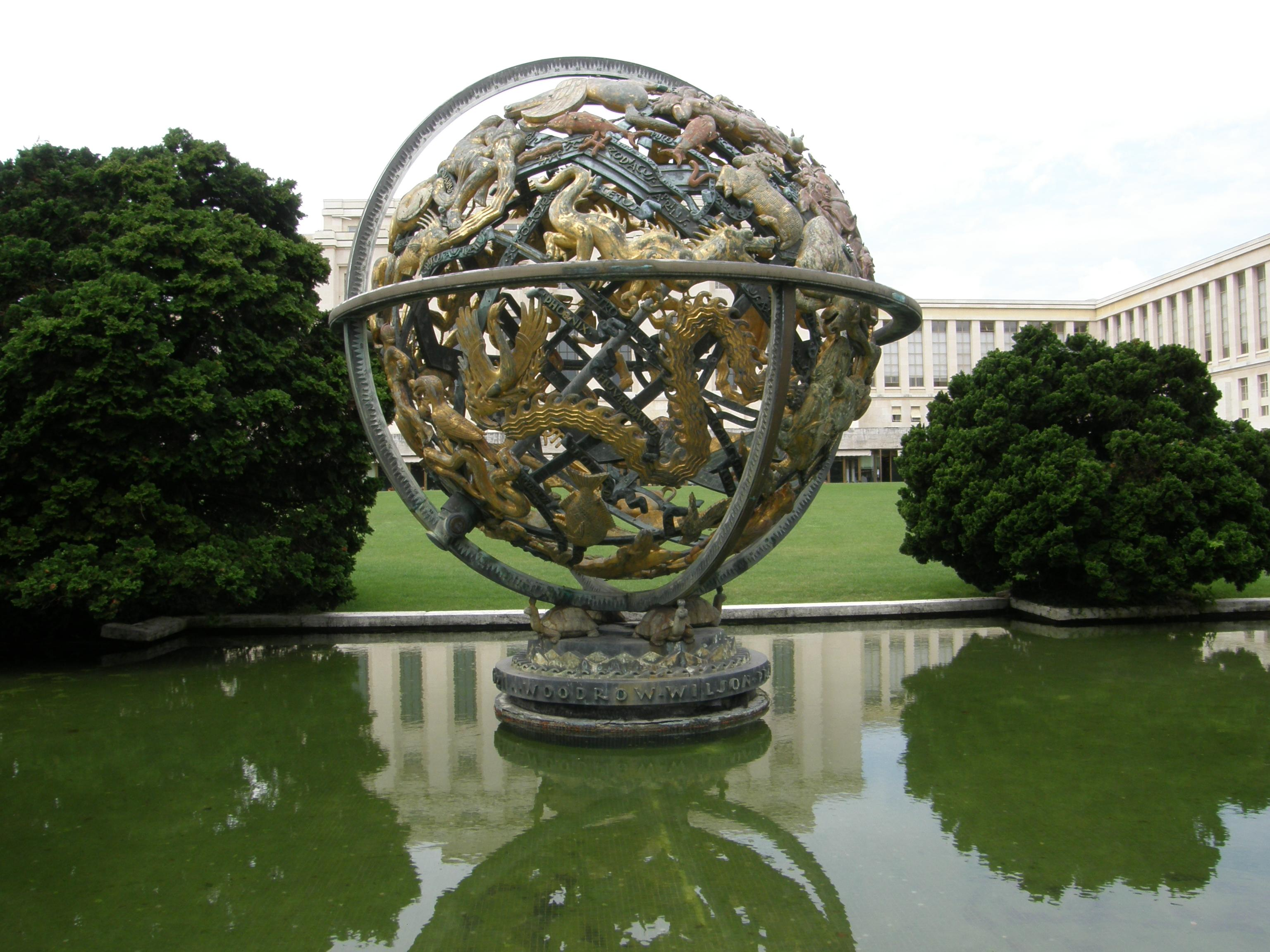
The Celestial Sphere Woodrow Wilson Memorial, Ariana Park, Palais des Nations, Geneva, Switzerland, 2010

The Celestial Sphere (also known as the Woodrow Wilson Memorial Sphere) is an armillary sphere artpiece situated in the Palais des Nations in Geneva, Switzerland, one of the four headquarters of the United Nations. It was donated in 1939 by the Woodrow Wilson Foundation to what was then the League of Nations building. It is today a symbol of Geneva International and of Geneva as the centre of dialogue and peace.

The grounds of the Palais des Nations (seat of the United Nations Office at Geneva) contain many fine objects donated by member states of the United Nations, private sponsors and artists. One of them is the huge—over four-meter-diameter—Celestial Sphere is the chef d'oeuvre of the American sculptor Paul Manship (1885–1966) located in the Ariana Park of the Palais des Nations.

== History ==
Contacted in late 1935 by the Board of the Woodrow Wilson Foundation, Manship was asked to provide an idea for a memorial to President of the United States Woodrow Wilson as the founding father of the League of Nations. At that time the Palais des Nations was still under construction.

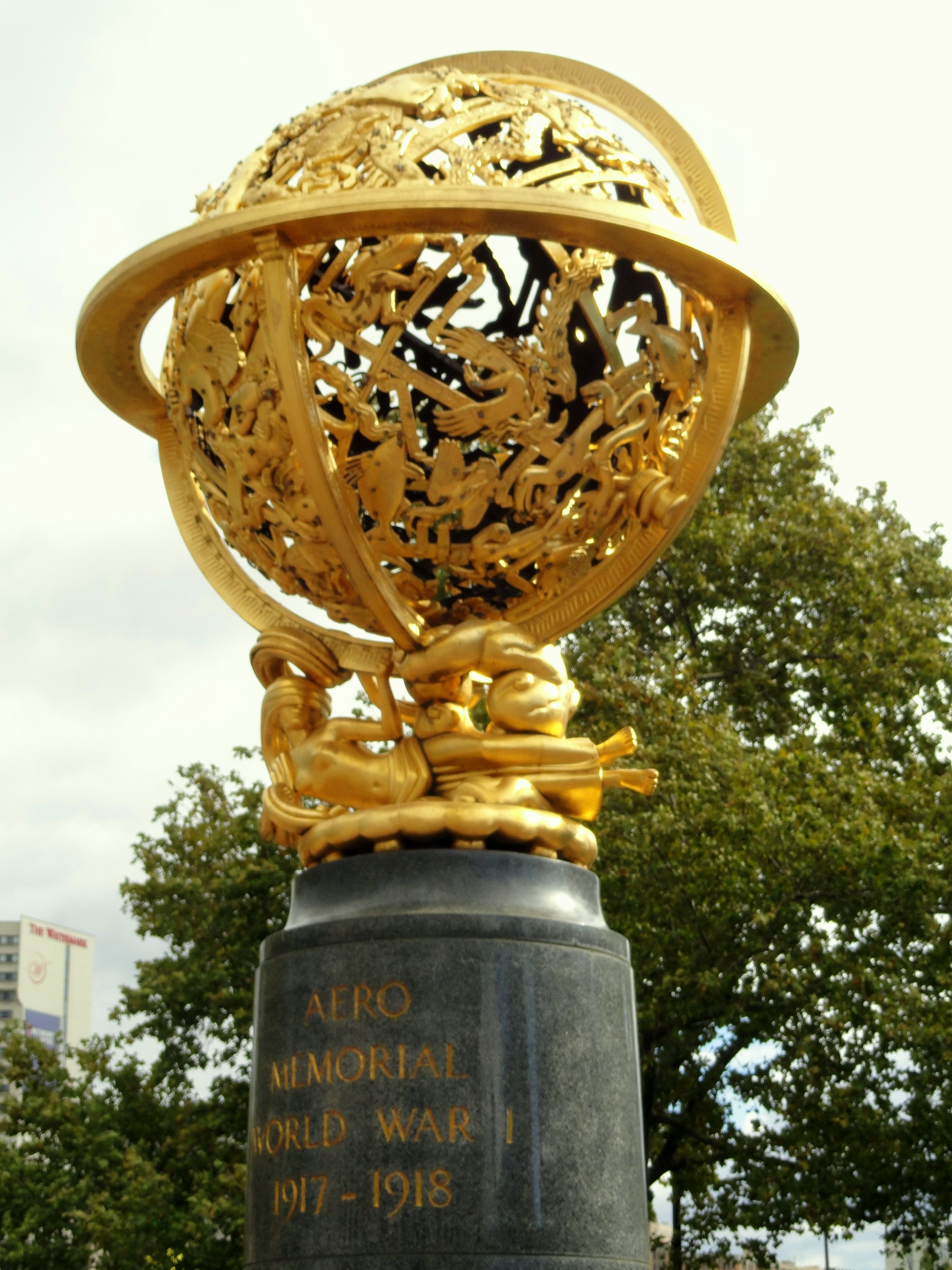
The Aero Memorial in Philadelphia

The first idea for Manship's contribution to the new buildings was to have him design two doors to the Assembly Hall from the Halle des Pas Perdus. Both the artist and the donor, the Woodrow Wilson Foundation, rejected this idea because doors would not be suitable for a memorial. Manship then proposed a large-scale version of the present celestial sphere, which he had developed after years of study. It is based upon several earlier versions, including the Aero Memorial in Philadelphia, Pennsylvania. It differs from these in that the Sphere is supported upon the backs of four tortoises, taken from his models for the gates to the New York Bronx Zoo, which in turn rest upon a stepped socle bearing a cast representation of the Chinese "celestial sea" (Hai Shui Jiang Ya). The tortoises may therefore be thought to represent the Chinese tortoise of immortality (Ao) - an auspicious symbol from Tang times on. Other zodiac signs come from the world's major civilizations, both past and present.

Manship described this sphere in the following words:

The representation of the heavenly constellations is derived from Babylonia and Assyria: the Greeks and Latins added their names and gave the constellations a local significance in some cases and I have adhered as closely as possible to the ancient forms. Thus the star, Aldebaran, which represents the eye of Taurus, dictates the character of the design, as is also the case of Regulus, Leo's Heart, and so with all the constellations. The forms and attitudes of the figures have been made to correspond firstly with the positions and the meanings of the emblems themselves. After that the inter-relationship of the constellations was designed to create a harmonious ensemble.

In a letter written by Ham Armstrong to Arthus Sweetser dated 30 June 1935, we read that the building committee considered the Celestial Sphere, which they had seen in Paris, superb, not only in originality of conception, but in delicacy of execution and in spirituality of meaning. However, two obstacles were foreseen; first, that it would cost more than the budget available and, second, that it would be difficult to obtain the approval of committee in New York and Geneva on anything so novel and non-utilitarian. Nonetheless, Manship's proposal for a monumental celestial sphere was accepted and a commission for the project was awarded to him in April 1936.

== Process ==
In spring of 1936, immediately after the approval by the committee, Manship began working on a large-scale model in wax. At his atelier, he gathered a team of sculptors and other artists to work on the various aspects of the design. The team included such famous names as Angelo Colombo, Giuseppe Massari, and Richard Pousette-Dart, the renowned painter who collaborated with Herbert Kammerer on the sphere's lettering.

The original plaster moulds, executed by Flitzer, were ready in 1938 and were sent to the Bruno Bearzi Atelier in Florence for casting. Bearzi cast the sphere's elements from these plaster moulds using a cire-perdu process from a bronze/zinc high-tin alloy with added lead. The constellations were originally gilded, with chrome-silvered starts. The meridians and architectural elements of the composition have been variously nielloed.

The Celestial Sphere measures 410 cm. in diameter and weighs some 5,800 kg. The spherical frame is adorned with constellations and stars. The Sphere represents 85 constellations of the universe and shows four stars of the first four magnitudes. The constellations are gilded and the 840 stars are silvered. As his signature, it bears Manship's self-portrait with his tools, in profile, hidden among the constellations.

== A place for the Celestial Sphere ==
One of the main difficulties was to find a location for the sphere. Even though Manship designed it for the Court of Honour in front of the Assembly Hall, the question was raised in 1937 whether this space should be left completely open for a full panorama. When neither the Woodrow Wilson Foundation nor the artist wanted to hear of a change in 1938, it was decided to put the sphere in the middle of the Park, not too close to the building and not too close to the trees. The sphere was placed in a small reservoir that would reflect the image of the sphere and the building in the water. The sphere was installed in its present location, in the Court d'Honneur of the Ariana park of the Palais des Nations by the Bearzi Atelier in August 1939. The official inauguration of what has become a United Nations symbol took place in September 1939.

The sphere is equipped with a motor. In the words of the artist it was designed "so that it would rotate slowly" around an axis turned to the Pole star, and it was intended to be illuminated at night.

== Concerns ==
=== Dysfunctional rotation system and illumination ===
Due to the outbreak of the Second World War the rotation motor of the Celestial Sphere was used for several months only. In the files of the Woodrow Wilson Foundation, the following brief description was found: "A complex silence and solitude reigned; the great ceremony of dedication, with the 30th Assembly in session, had become impossible: only an occasional chance visitor and a few especially interested Americans watched the Italians putting the great sphere, representative of universal comity, into its place of high honour." The rotation motor of the Celestial Sphere was not used during 1940–1945 and ceased to function in the early 1960s.

=== Deteriorating conditions ===
The sphere began to have significant problems as early as 1942. The alloy used by the Bearzi Atelier contracted so sharply during the winter that a considerable amount of water could and did enter the hollow constellations. The freezing of that water caused the metal to crack. Already several of the constellations had to be repaired in 1942–43 and at least one cover of a meridian had to be replaced after falling off. "Weep holes" were drilled in all the constellations at that time to allow the water to drain out. The socle, which bears the whole of the 5,800 kg weight, has cracked. Large areas of corrosion and uneven natural patina are seen. The 840 chrome-plated stars, once present in four sizes, have been widely lost. The sphere cage is at the limit of its weight bearing load. Metal fatigue, cracks and corrosion have increasingly added to its deterioration.

=== Restorations ===
A restoration of the monument was first undertaken in 1983, qualified as "clumsy" for using materials such as concrete in filling parts of the shallow pieces.

In 2003, some elements of the sphere were regilded towards a start of, restoration although it had to be delated for more than a decade. Finally, in the late 2010s, thanks to the funding by "an anonymous donation," the sculpture was newly restored in Italy by the Ferdinando Marinelli Artistic Foundry.

== Symbol of Peace "Pax Universalis" ==
Today the Celestial Sphere stands in the Court d’Honneur of the Palais des Nations, itself a landmark of the City of Geneva. It serves as a reminder to appreciate cultural and religious differences. One of the contributors to a Pax Universalis is an action-oriented dialogue, based on common human values and the ideals of the United Nations.

== Gallery ==
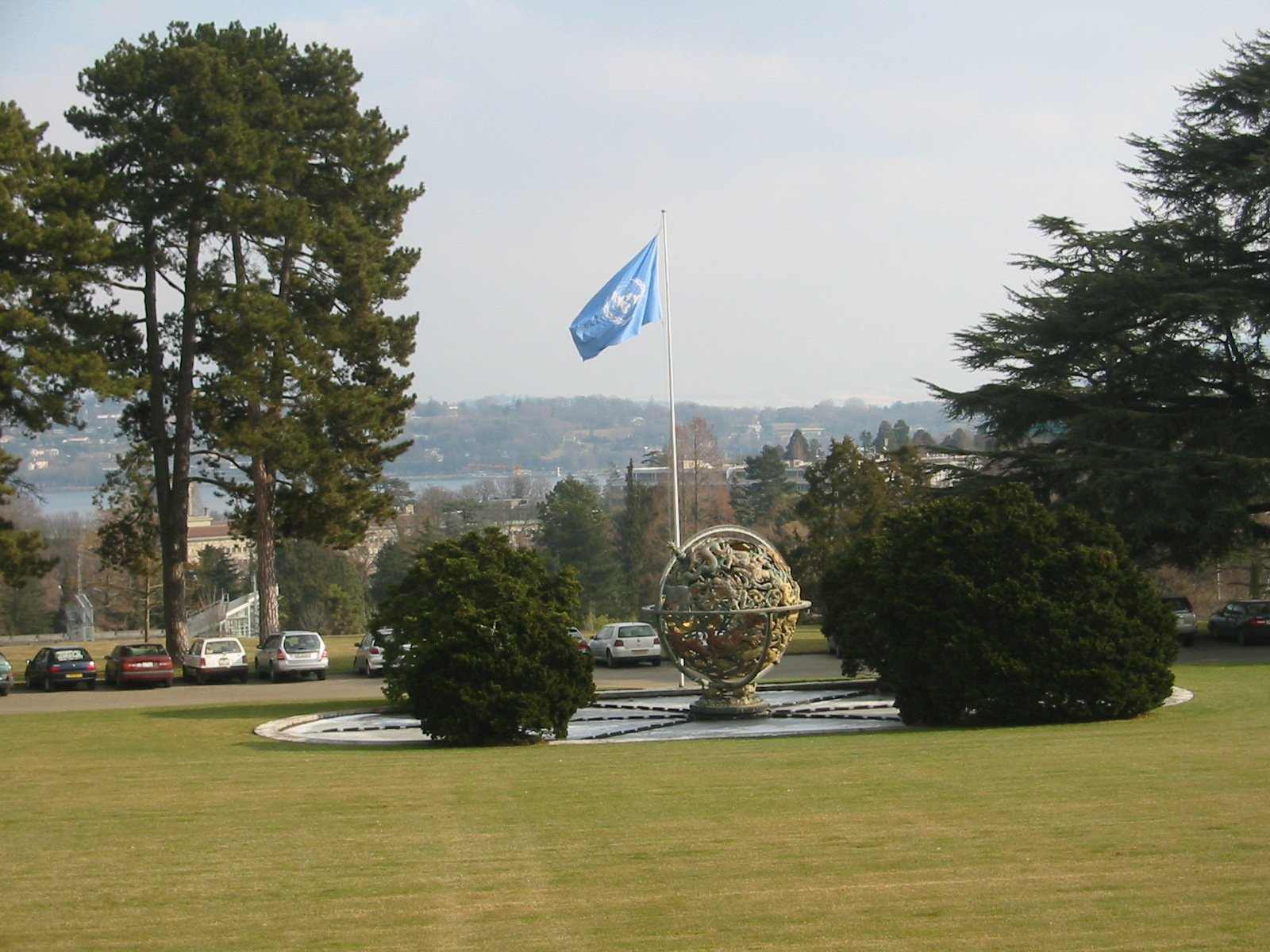
The Celestial Sphere Woodrow Wilson Memorial in the Ariana Park with Lake Geneva in the background.

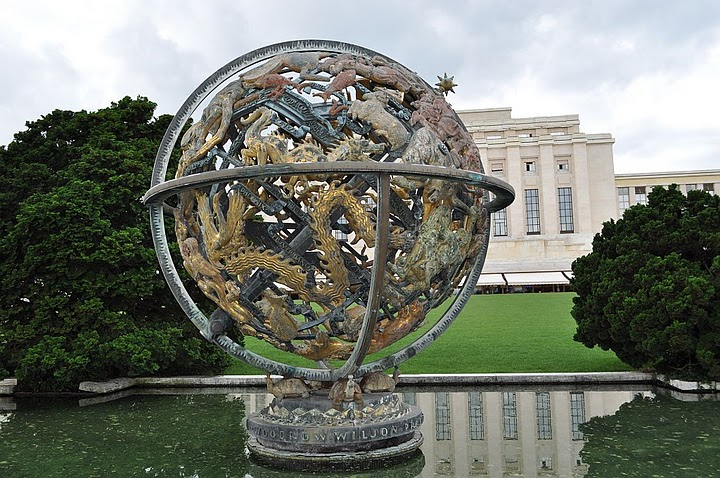
The Celestial Sphere Woodrow Wilson Memorial with the Assembly Hall in the background. Palais des Nations, Geneva, 2010.

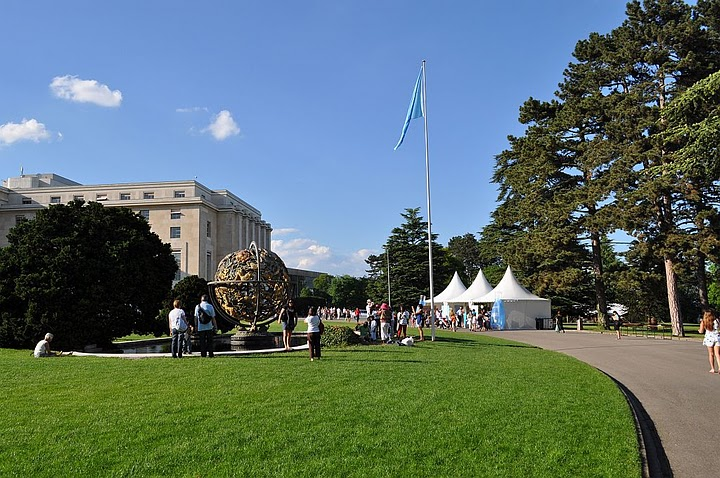
Open day at the Palais des Nations in the Ariana Park, 5 June 2010.

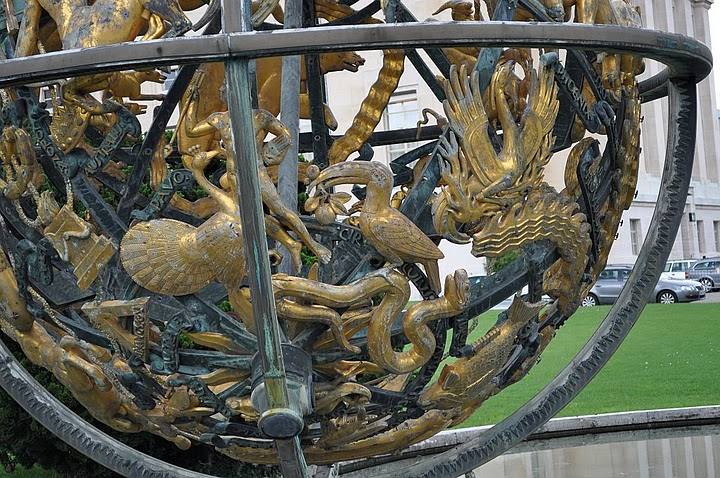
Portion of the Celestial Sphere, 2010.

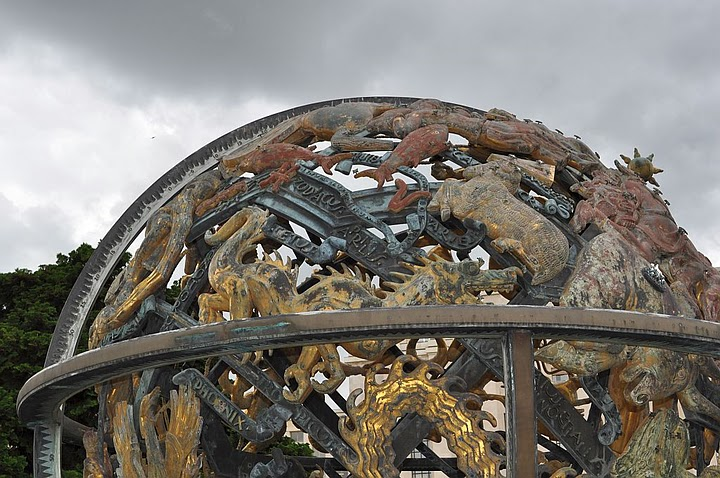
Portion of the Celestial Sphere, upper part 2010.

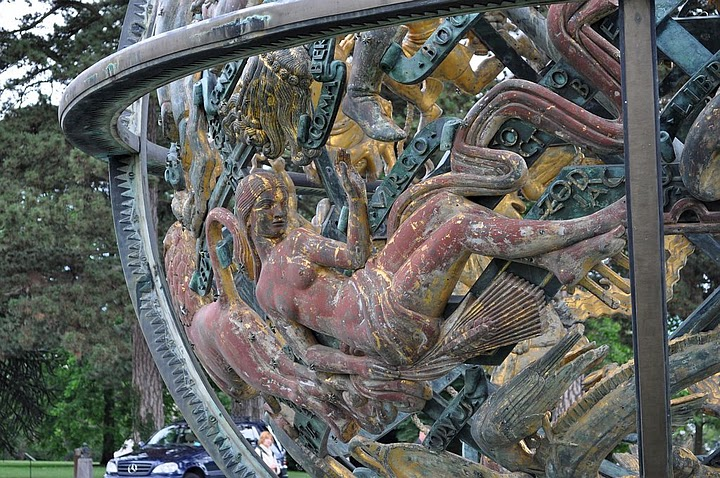
Critical state of the Celestial Sphere, portion with signs of corrosion, 2010.

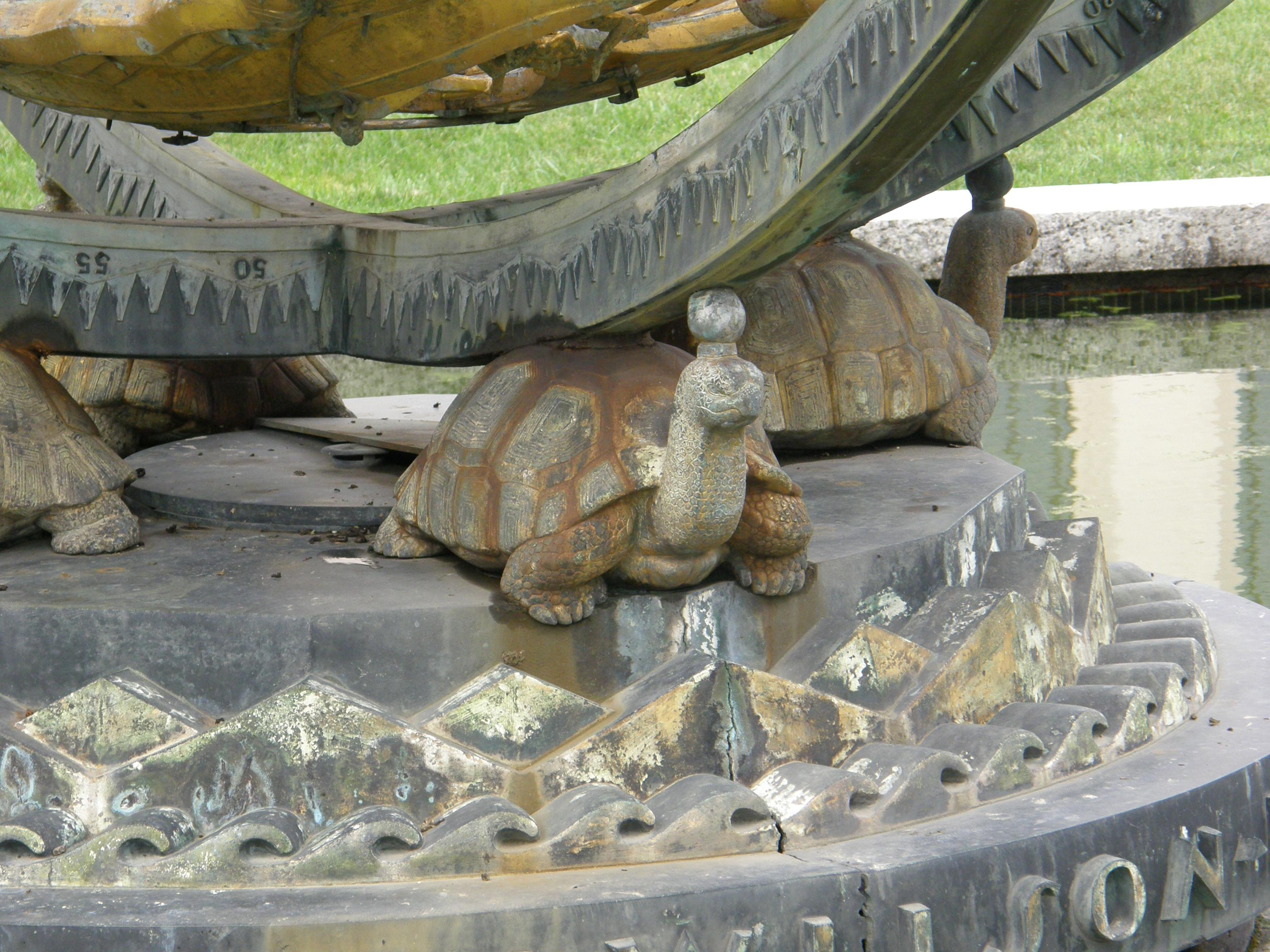
Portion of the Celestial Sphere with the turtles, 2010.

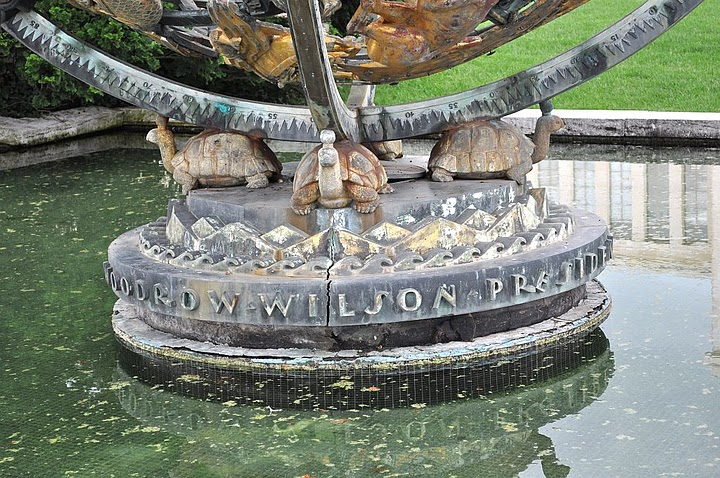
Critical state of the Celestial Sphere, 2010.
