= Aero Memorial (Manship) =

Coordinates: 39.958335°N 75.171788°W

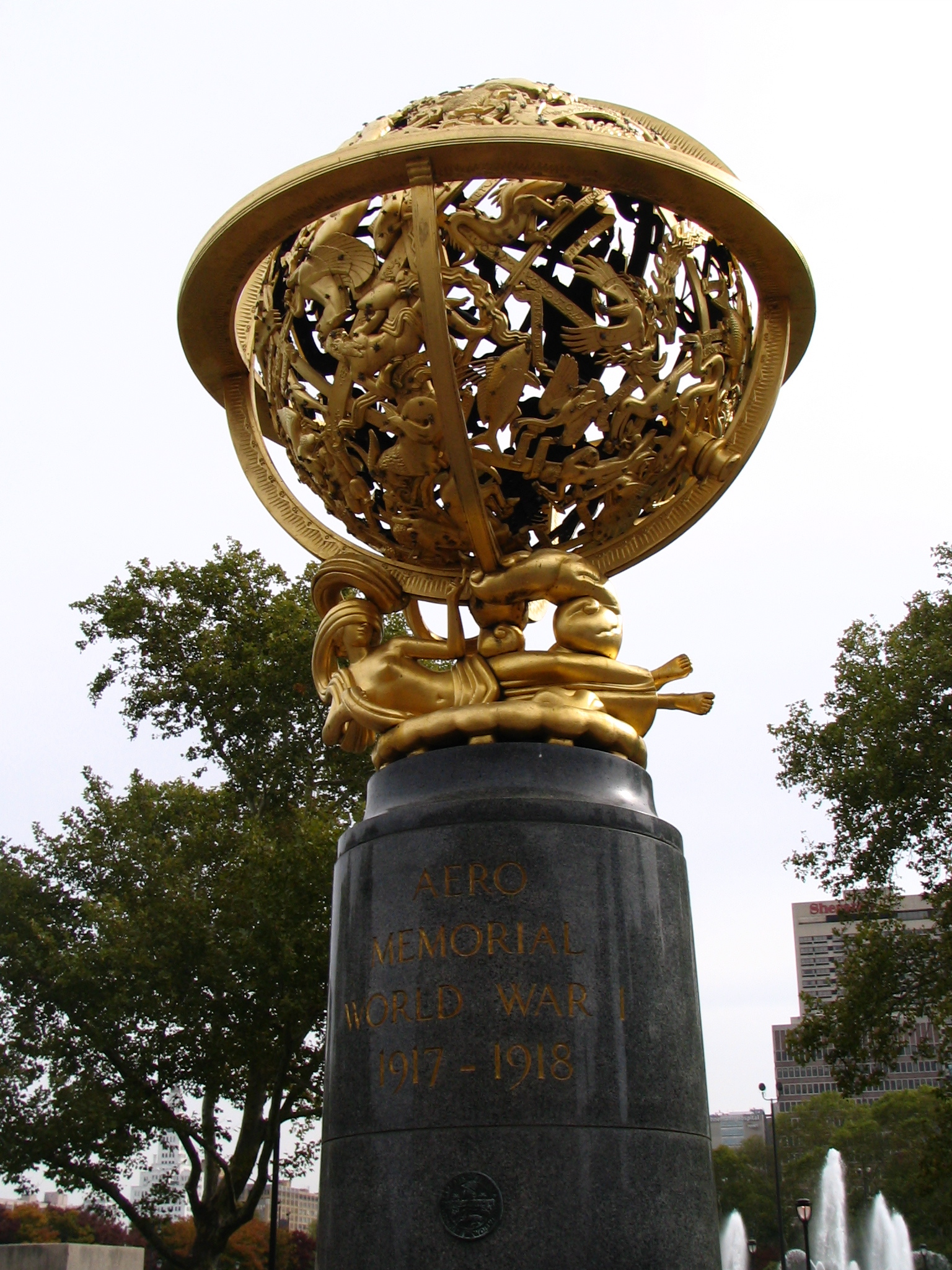
- Artist: Paul Manship
- Year: 1948
- Type: Bronze
- Location: Philadelphia
- Owner: City of Philadelphia; Commissioned by the Association for Public Art (formerly the Fairmount Park Art Association)

The Aero Memorial is a gilded bronze sculpture by Paul Manship, commissioned by the Association for Public Art (formerly the Fairmount Park Art Association). Aero Memorial is located in Philadelphia's Aviator Park, across from The Franklin Institute at 20th Street and the Benjamin Franklin Parkway. The memorial is a tribute to those aviators who died in World War I, and it was initiated by the Aero Club of Pennsylvania in 1917 with the help of the Fairmount Park Art Association. The Aero Club donated modest funds into the Fairmount Park Art Association in 1917 for the creation of the memorial, and after years of fundraising, the Art Association was finally able to contact Paul Manship for the commission 1939. The idea for a celestial sphere was approved in 1944, and the sculpture was completed in 1948. Aero Memorial was dedicated on June 1, 1950. Aero Memorial is one of 51 sculptures included in the Association for Public Art's Museum Without Walls interpretive audio program for Philadelphia's outdoor sculpture.

The inscription reads:
(Sphere is inscribed with the Latin names of constellations and planets)
(Base, front:)
AERO
MEMORIAL
WORLD WAR I
1917–1918
(Base, front:)
JULIAN BIDDLE
HOWARD FOULKE DAY
(...transcription illegible)
ON DOWNS, JR.
(...transcription illegible)
CHRISTIAN CLANZ
WILLIAM BESSE KOEN
(...transcription illegible)
TON WOODWARD
(A plaque with the insignia of the Fairmount Park Art Association appears on the base.)

== See also ==
External videos
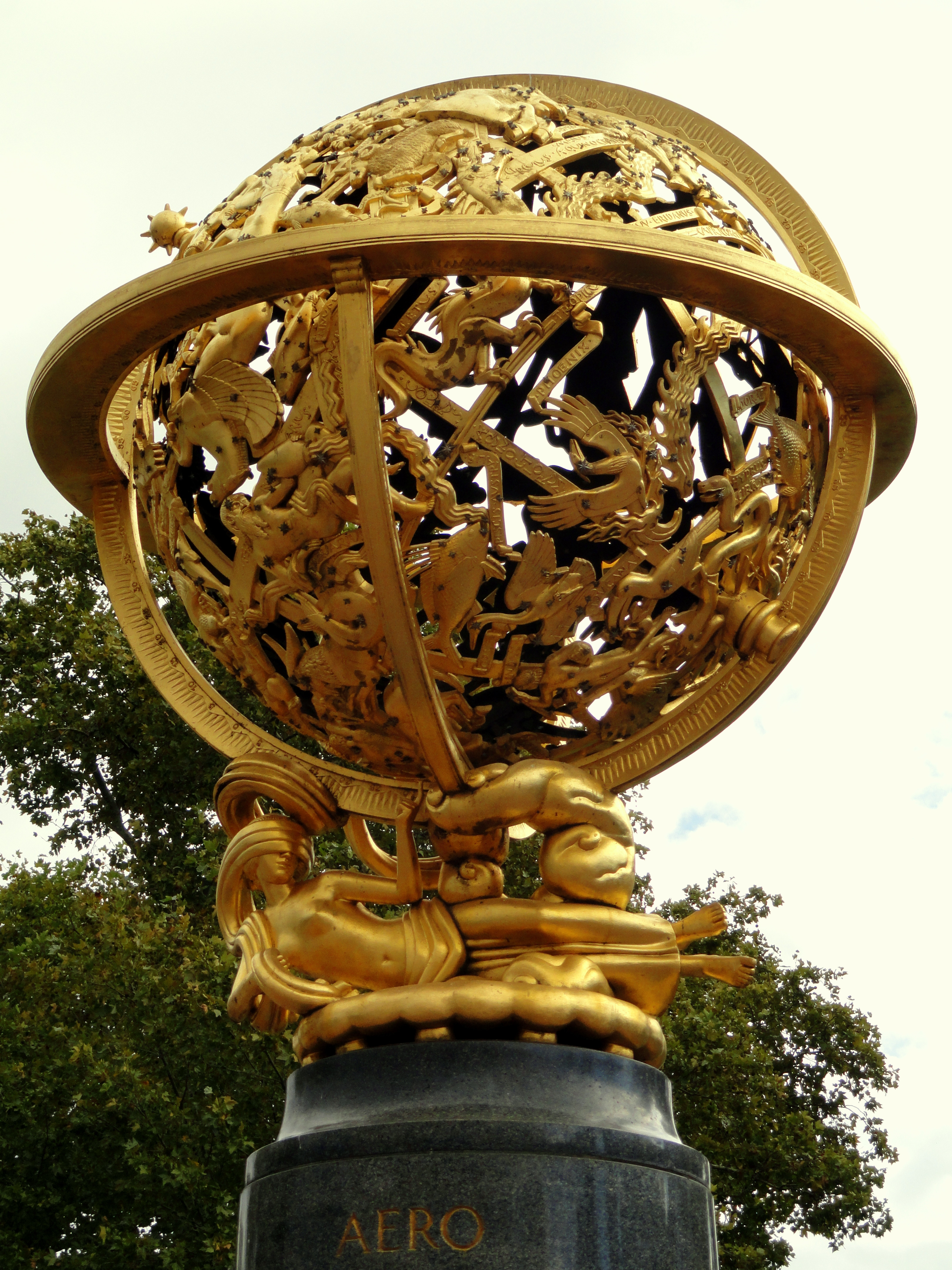
- Aero Memorial (1948), Association for Public Art

- List of public art in Philadelphia
