= Paul Manship =

American sculptor (1885–1966)

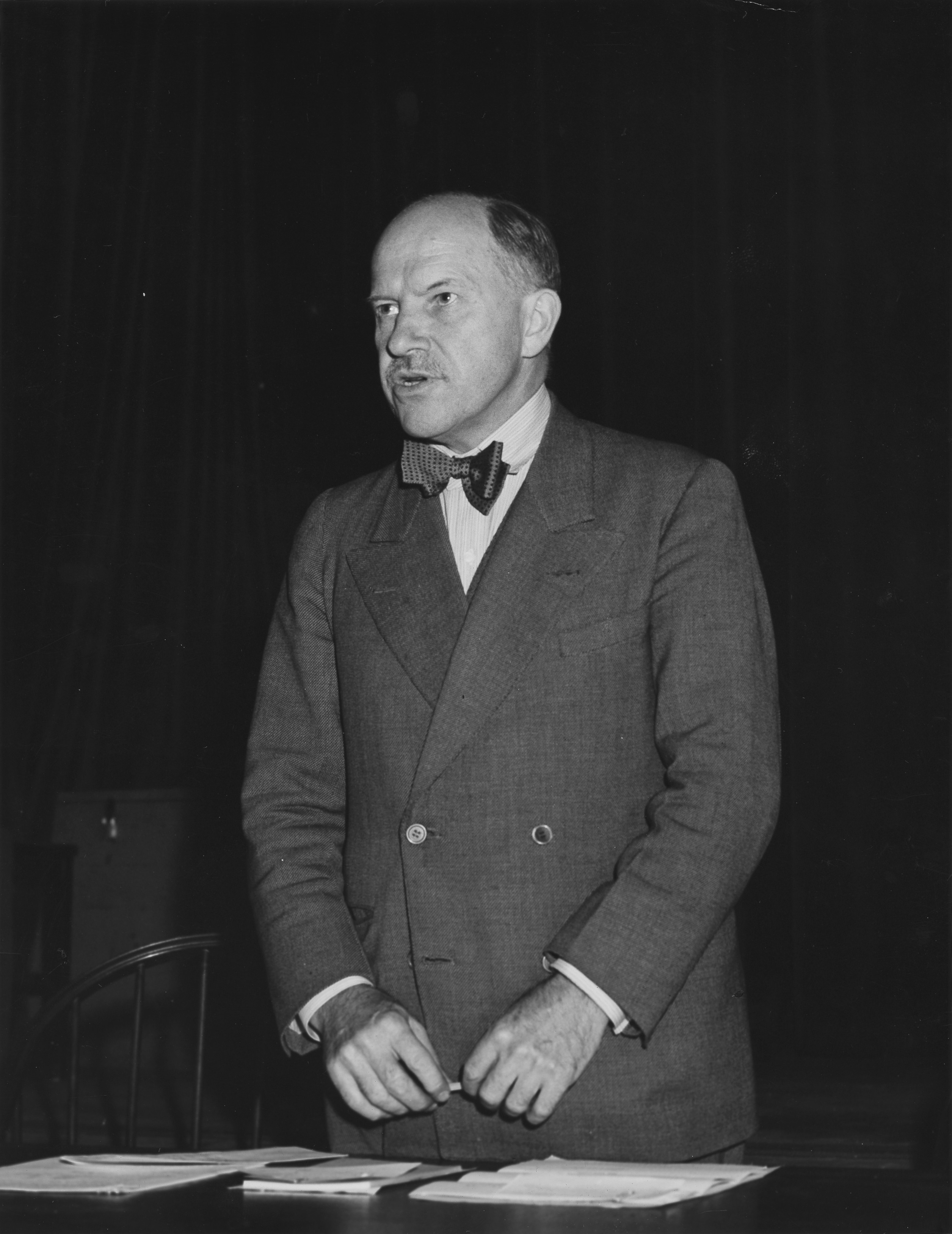
- Manship in 1941
- Born: Paul Howard Manship; December 25, 1885; Saint Paul, Minnesota, U.S.
- Died: January 31, 1966 (aged 80); New York, U.S.
- Known for: Sculpture

Paul Howard Manship (December 25, 1885 – January 31, 1966) was an American sculptor. He consistently created mythological pieces in a classical style, and was a major force in the Art Deco movement. He is well known for his large public commissions, including the iconic Prometheus in Rockefeller Center and the Celestial Sphere Woodrow Wilson Memorial in Geneva, Switzerland. He is also credited for designing the modern rendition of New York City's official seal.

Manship gained notice early in his career for rejecting the Beaux-Arts architecture movement and preferring linear compositions with a flowing simplicity. Additionally, he shared a summer home in Plainfield, New Hampshire, part of the Cornish Art Colony, with William Zorach for a number of years. Other members of the highly social colony were also contemporary artists. Manship created his own artist retreat on Cape Ann, developing a 15-acre site on two former granite quarries in Lanesville, a village of Gloucester, MA. A local nonprofit, the Manship Artists Residency was established in 2015 to preserve this estate as an artist residency program.

== Life ==
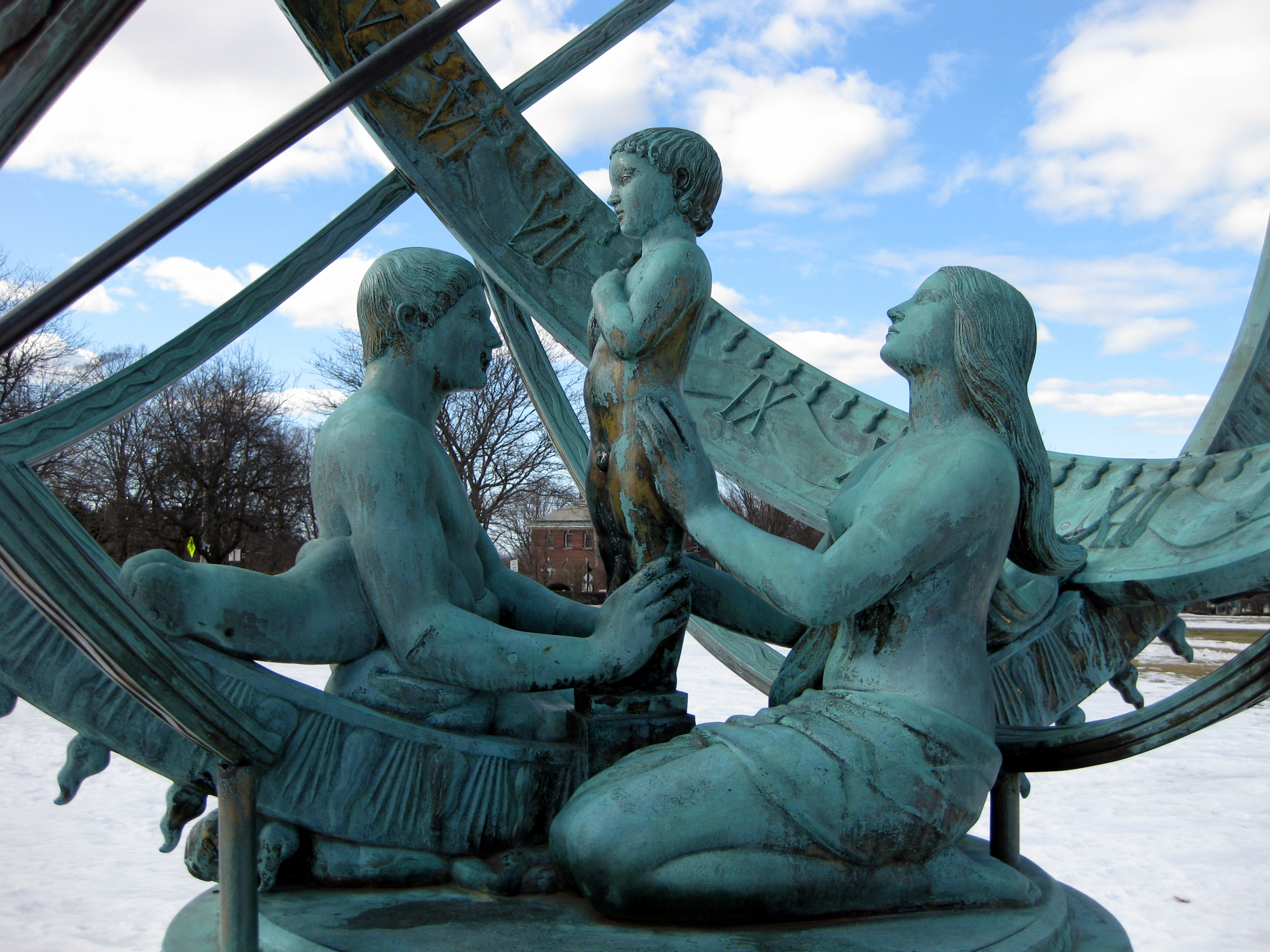
Cycle of Life, 1924, Phillips Academy, Andover, Massachusetts

=== Early life and education ===
Paul Howard Manship was born in St. Paul, Minnesota, on December 25, 1885, the son of Charles H. and Mary Etta (Friend) Manship. His father, born in Mississippi, was a clerk for the St. Paul gas company, and with his wife, who was born in Pennsylvania, were parents of seven children. Charles and Mary were married in St. Paul, on July 14, 1870, and raised their family in a home they owned at 304 Nelson (later Marshall) Avenue. Paul H. Manship began his art studies at the St. Paul School of Art in Minnesota. From there he moved to Philadelphia and continued his education at the Pennsylvania Academy of Fine Arts. Following that he migrated to New York City where he enrolled in the Art Students League of New York, studying anatomy with George Bridgman and modeling under Hermon Atkins MacNeil. From 1905 to 1907 he served as an assistant to sculptor Solon Borglum and spent the two years after that studying with Charles Grafly and assisting Isidore Konti.

In 1909, at Konti's urging, he entered the competition for, and won, the Rome Prize and shortly thereafter decamped for Rome where he attended the American Academy from 1909 until 1912. While in Europe he became increasingly interested in Archaic art, his own work began to take on some archaic features, and he became more and more attracted to classical subjects. He also developed an interest in classical sculpture of India, and traces of that influence can be observed in his work (see Dancer and Gazelles in Gallery). Manship was one of the first artists to become aware of the vast scope of art history being newly excavated at the time and became intensely interested in Egyptian, Assyrian and pre-classical Greek sculpture.

=== Career ===
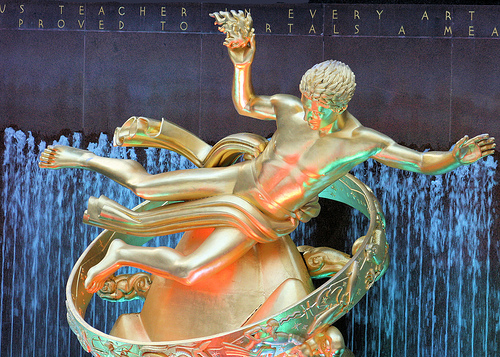
Prometheus, 1934, at Rockefeller Center in New York City

When he returned to the United States from his European sojourn, Manship found that his style was attractive to both modernists and conservatives. His simplification of line and detail appealed to those who wished to move beyond the Beaux-Arts classical realism prevalent in the day. Also, his view of and use of a more traditional "beauty" as well as an avoidance of the more radical and abstract trends in art made his works attractive to more conservative art collectors. Manship's work is often considered to be a major precursor to Art Deco.

Manship produced over 700 works and always employed assistants of the highest quality. At least two of them, Gaston Lachaise and Leo Friedlander, went on to create significant places for themselves in the history of American sculpture.

Although not known as a portraitist, he did produce statues and busts of Theodore Roosevelt, Samuel Osgood, John D. Rockefeller, Robert Frost, Gifford Beal, and Henry L. Stimson. Manship was very adept at low relief and used these skills to produce a large number of coins and medals. Among his more prominent are the Dionysus medal, the second issue of the long running Society of Medalists; the first term inaugural medal for Franklin D. Roosevelt; and the John F. Kennedy inaugural medal. Additionally, during WW II he designed the U. S. Merchant Marine's Distinguished Service Medal, Meritorious Service Medal and Mariner's Medal.

Manship was chosen by the American Battle Monuments Commission to create monuments following both the First and Second World Wars. They are located respectively in the St. Mihiel American Cemetery and Memorial at Thiaucourt, France, and in the military cemetery at Anzio, Italy. His work was also part of the art competitions at the 1928 Summer Olympics and the 1932 Summer Olympics.

=== Affiliations and awards ===
For a number of summers early in his career, Manship found social and artistic companionship in Plainfield, New Hampshire, then part of the Cornish Art Colony, which attracted sculptors such as Augustus Saint-Gaudens, Herbert Adams, Daniel Chester French, and William Zorach. He visited first in 1915, returned the next three years, and then returned again a decade later. This period in his life has been recognized as significant, and Harry Rand observed that "Manship recognized 1916 as the year of his artistic maturity...[he] seemed to express modern ideas in terms of the primitive.

Manship served on the board of the Smithsonian American Art Museum and chaired the board. Manship was affiliated with the National Academy of Design, the National Sculpture Society, and the American Academy of Arts and Letters. He served on the U.S. Commission of Fine Arts from 1937 to 1941. His many honors include a Pierpont Morgan fellowship, a Widener Gold Medal from the Pennsylvania Academy of Fine Arts, the Golden Plate Award of the American Academy of Achievement, and the award of Chevalier from the French Legion of Honor. Manship's extensive papers, maquettes and sculptures are housed in the Smithsonian's Archives of American Art. In 2004 the Smithsonian mounted a retrospective of Manship's career which resulted in a reappraisal of the sculptor's work.

From 2007 to 2015, there was a gallery dedicated to the display of Manship's work at the Smithsonian American Art Museum. It featured twenty-five of the nearly five hundred Manship artworks from the museum's collection.

Paul Manship was the father of the artist John Paul Manship (1927–2000).

== Museums with Manship works ==
- Addison Gallery of American Art (Andover, Mass.)
- Amon Carter Museum (Texas)
- Art Institute of Chicago
- Ball State University Museum of Art (Muncie, Ind.)
- Brigham Young University Museum of Art (Provo, Utah)
- Cincinnati Art Museum
- Cape Ann Museum (Gloucester, Mass.)
- Carnegie Museum of Art (Pittsburgh, PA)
- Castle Hill on the Crane Estate (Ipswich, MA)
- Cleveland Museum of Art
- Colby College Museum of Art (Waterville, Me.)
- Corcoran Gallery of Art (Washington, D.C.)
- Courtauld Institute of Art (London)
- Crystal Bridges Museum of American Art (Bentonville, Ark.)
- Dayton Art Institute (Ohio)
- Delaware Art Museum (Wilmington, Del.)
- Harvard University Art Museums
- Heckscher Museum of Art (Huntington, N.Y.)
- Honolulu Museum of Art
- Hudson River Museum (Yonkers, N.Y.)
- The Huntington (San Marino, Calif.)
- Indianapolis Museum of Art
- Isabella Stewart Gardner Museum (Boston)
- Kalamazoo Institute of Arts (Kalamazoo, MI.)
- Joslyn Art Museum (Omaha, Neb.)
- Los Angeles County Museum of Art
- Minneapolis Institute of Arts
- Minnesota Museum of American Art (Saint Paul)
- Museum of Fine Arts, Boston
- Museum of Fine Arts, Houston
- National Academy of Design (New York City)
- National Gallery of Art (Washington D.C.)
- National Museum of Wildlife Art (Jackson Hole, Wyo.)
- New Britain Museum of American Art (Connecticut)
- New Orleans Museum of Art
- North Carolina Museum of Art (Raleigh, NC)
- Norton Museum of Art (West Palm Beach))
- R.W. Norton Art Gallery (Shreveport, LA)
- Seattle Art Museum (Seattle, WA)
- Smithsonian American Art Museum (Washington D.C.)
- Speed Art Museum (Louisville, Ky.)
- Toledo Museum of Art (Ohio)
- Utah Museum of Fine Arts (Salt Lake City, Utah)
- Virginia Museum of Fine Arts (Richmond, VA)
- Walker Art Center (Minneapolis)
- Westmoreland Museum of American Art (Greensburg, Penn.)

== Public sculpture ==
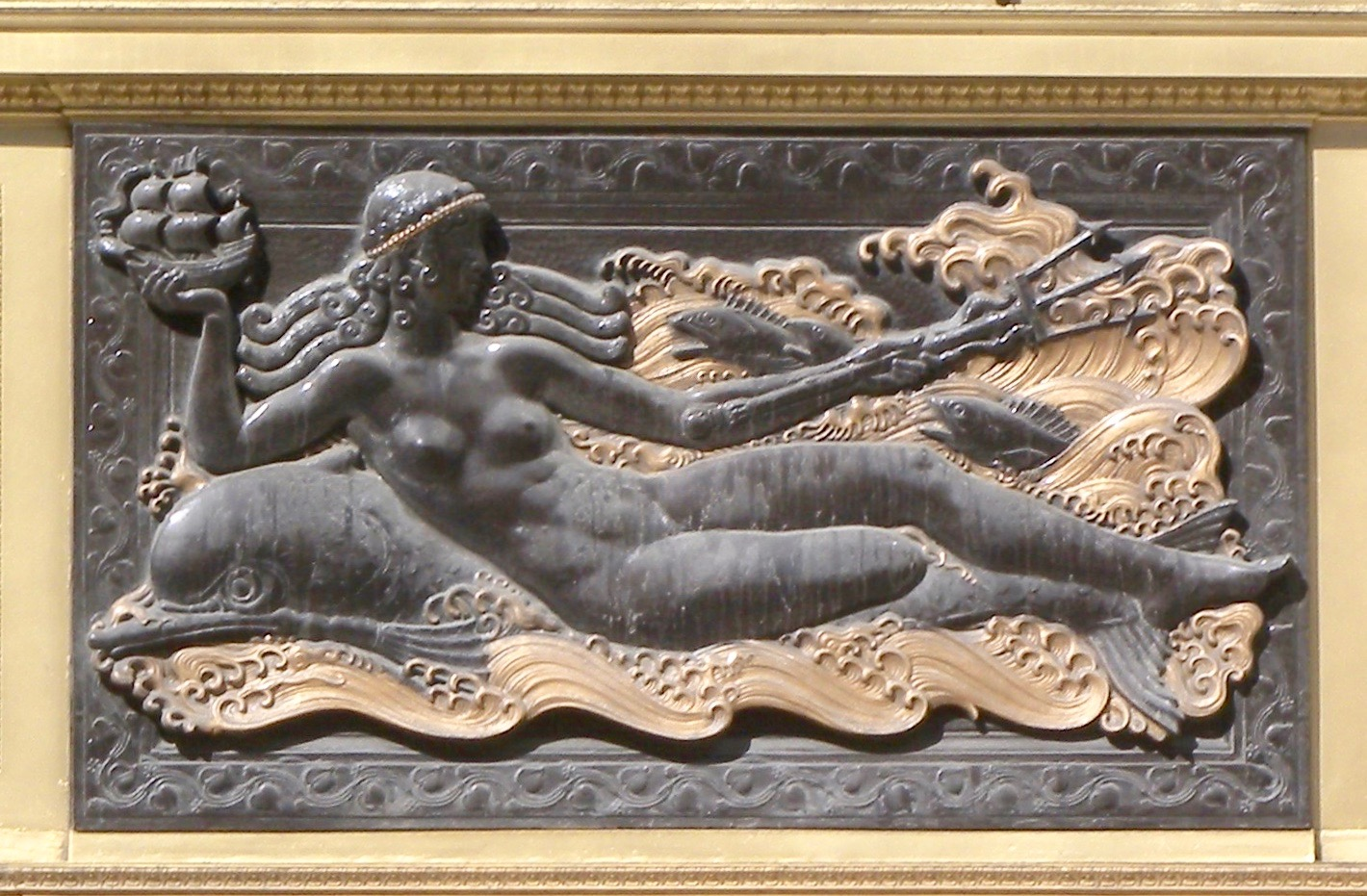
Water at 195 Broadway, New York City

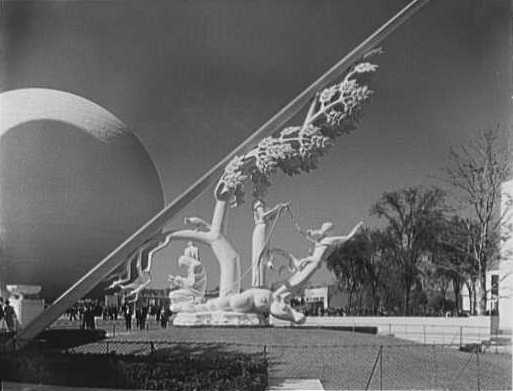
Time and the Fates of Man Sundial, 1939 World's Fair

- Indian Hunter, Boston
- Earth, Air, Water and Fire, bronze reliefs for the American Telephone & Telegraph Building (now 195 Broadway), Manhattan, New York City, 1914
- Sphinxes, Untermyer Gardens, Yonkers, New York, 1917
- J. Pierpont Morgan Relief Plaque, Metropolitan Museum of Art, Manhattan, New York City, 1920
- The Flight of Europa, 1920s, outside Hollywood Home Savings and Loan, Los Angeles, California
- Indian Hunter and his Dog, Cochran Park, St. Paul, Minnesota, 1926
- Abraham Lincoln: The Hoosier Youth, Fort Wayne, Indiana, 1932
- Waldo Hutchins bench, bench's sundial's small Art Deco bronze gnomon sculpture of a female dancer trailed by a wind-blown gown and flowing scarves, Central Park, Manhattan, New York City, 1932
- Paul Rainey Memorial Gateway, Bronx Zoo, New York City, 1934
- Prometheus, Rockefeller Center, New York City, 1934.
- Group of Bears, Bronx Zoo, New York City, 1926–39, in Central Park and in Jerusalem Biblical Zoo.
- Time and the Fates of Man Sundial, 1939 World's Fair, Queens, New York City, 1939
- Celestial Sphere Woodrow Wilson Memorial, Palais des Nations, United Nations Office, Geneva, Switzerland, 1939.
- Franklin Roosevelt Memorial, Keneseth Israel Synagogue 1946
- President Albert Murphree, University of Florida, Gainesville, Florida, 1946
- Lehman/Tisch Gateway, Central Park Zoo, Manhattan, New York City, 1961
- Theodore Roosevelt statue, Theodore Roosevelt Island, Washington, D.C., 1967

== Gallery ==
Cycle of Life armillary sphere, Phillips Academy, Andover, Massachusetts

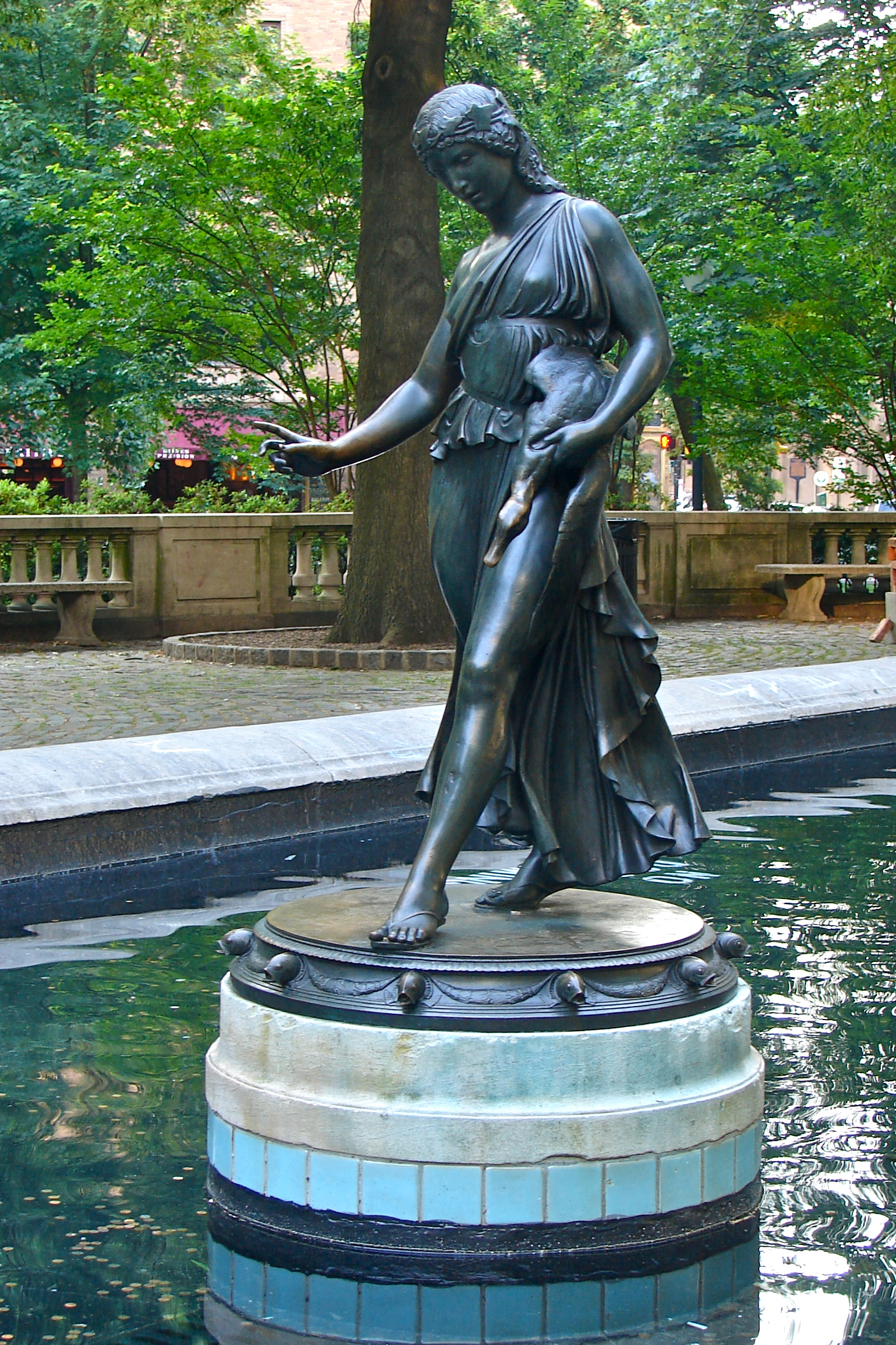
Duck Girl, 1911, Rittenhouse Square, Philadelphia

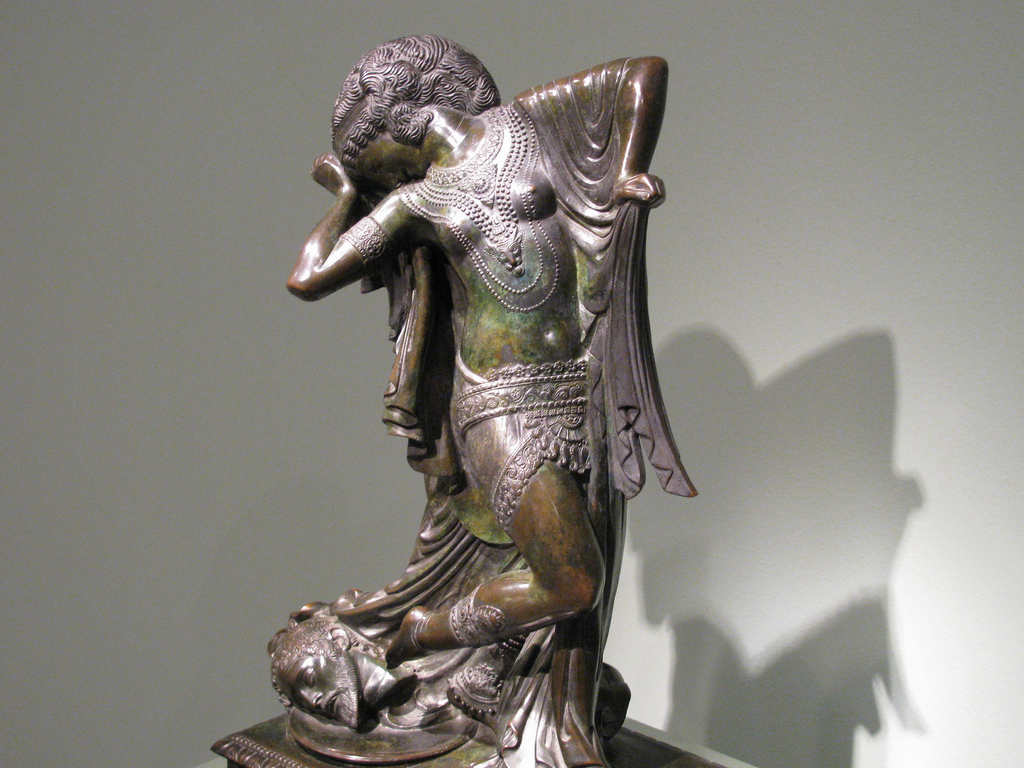
Salome, 1915, Smithsonian American Art Museum, Washington, D.C.

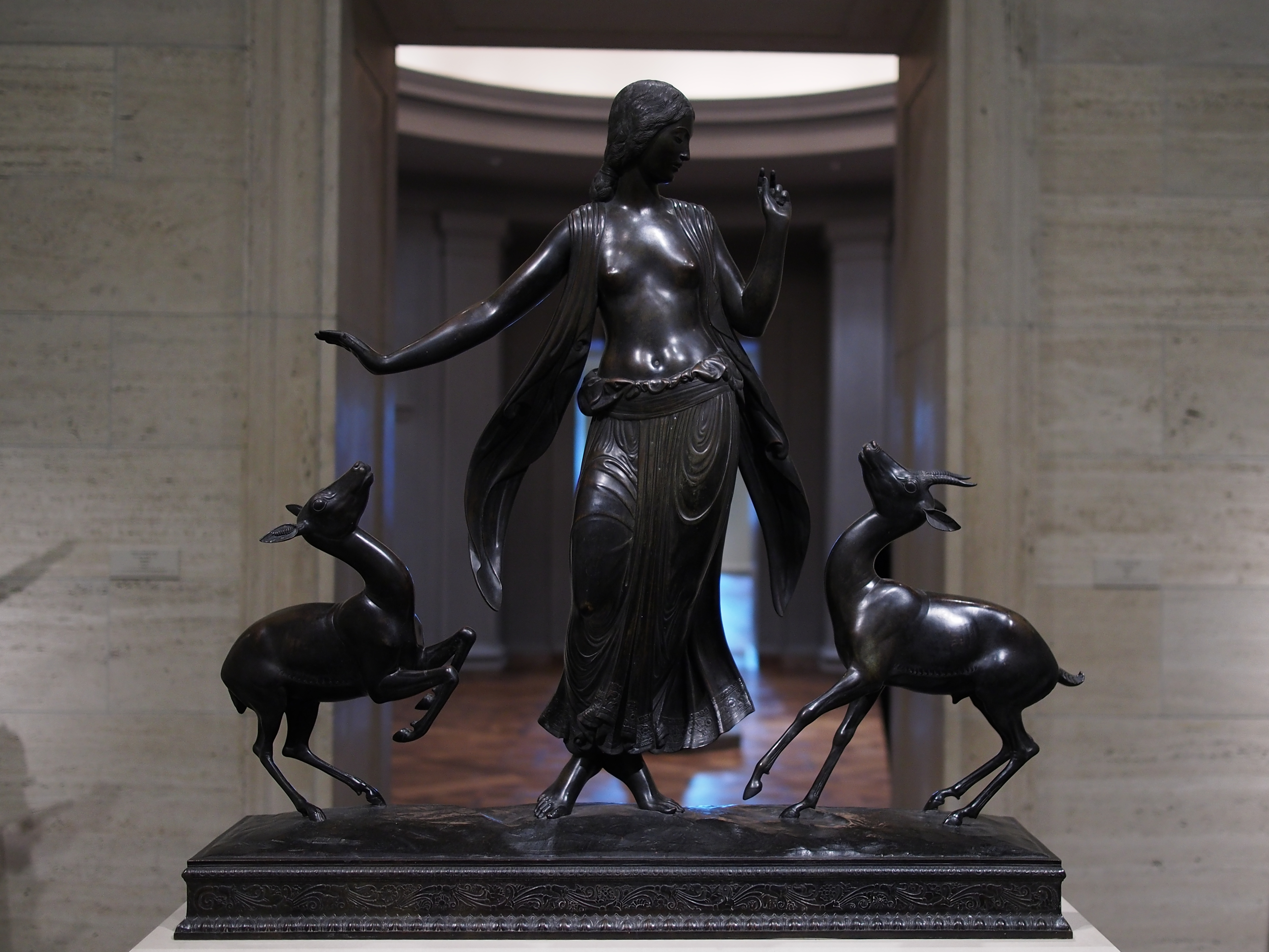
Dancer and Gazelles, 1916, Smithsonian American Art Museum, Washington, D.C.

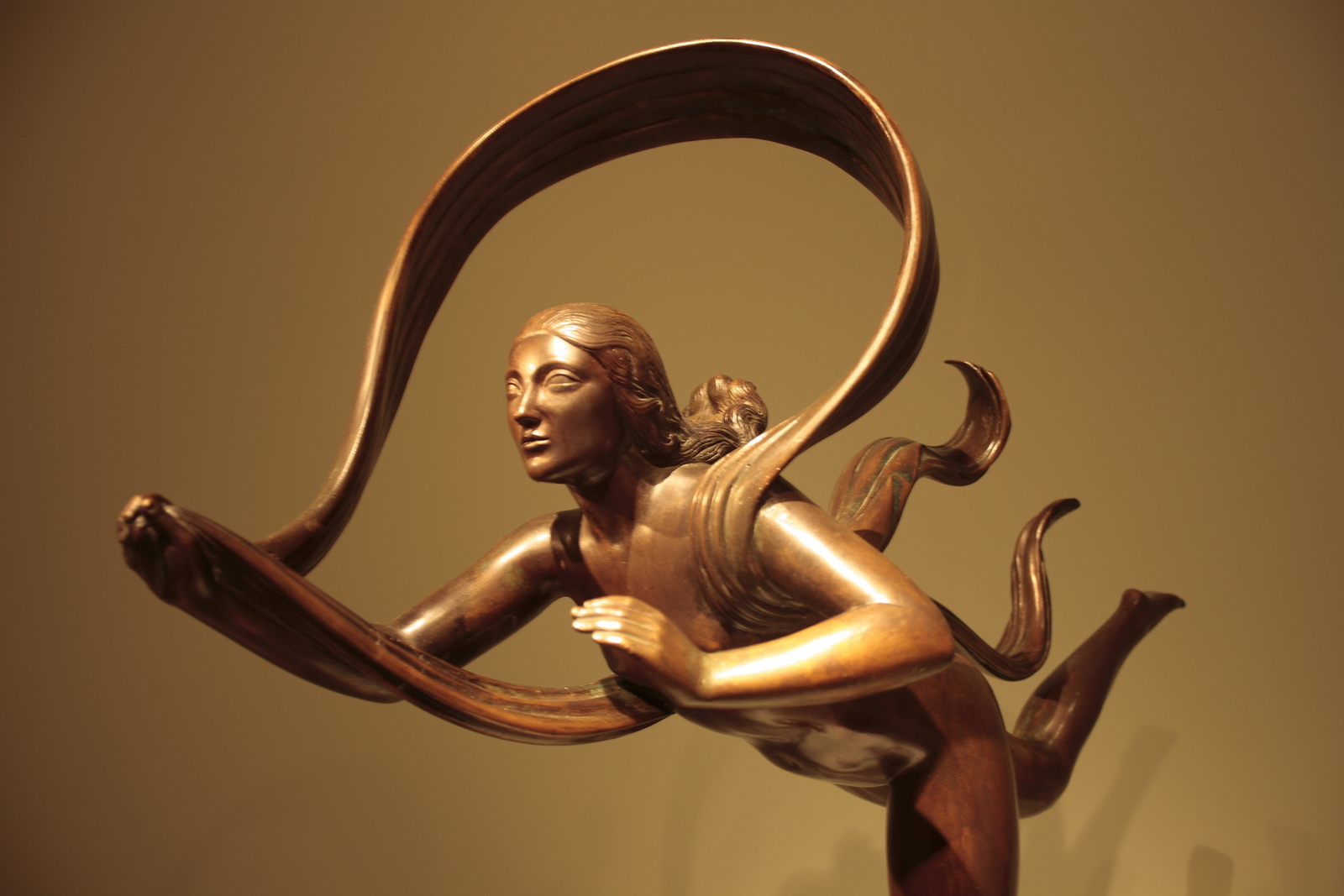
Atalanta, 1921, Smithsonian American Art Museum, Washington, D.C.

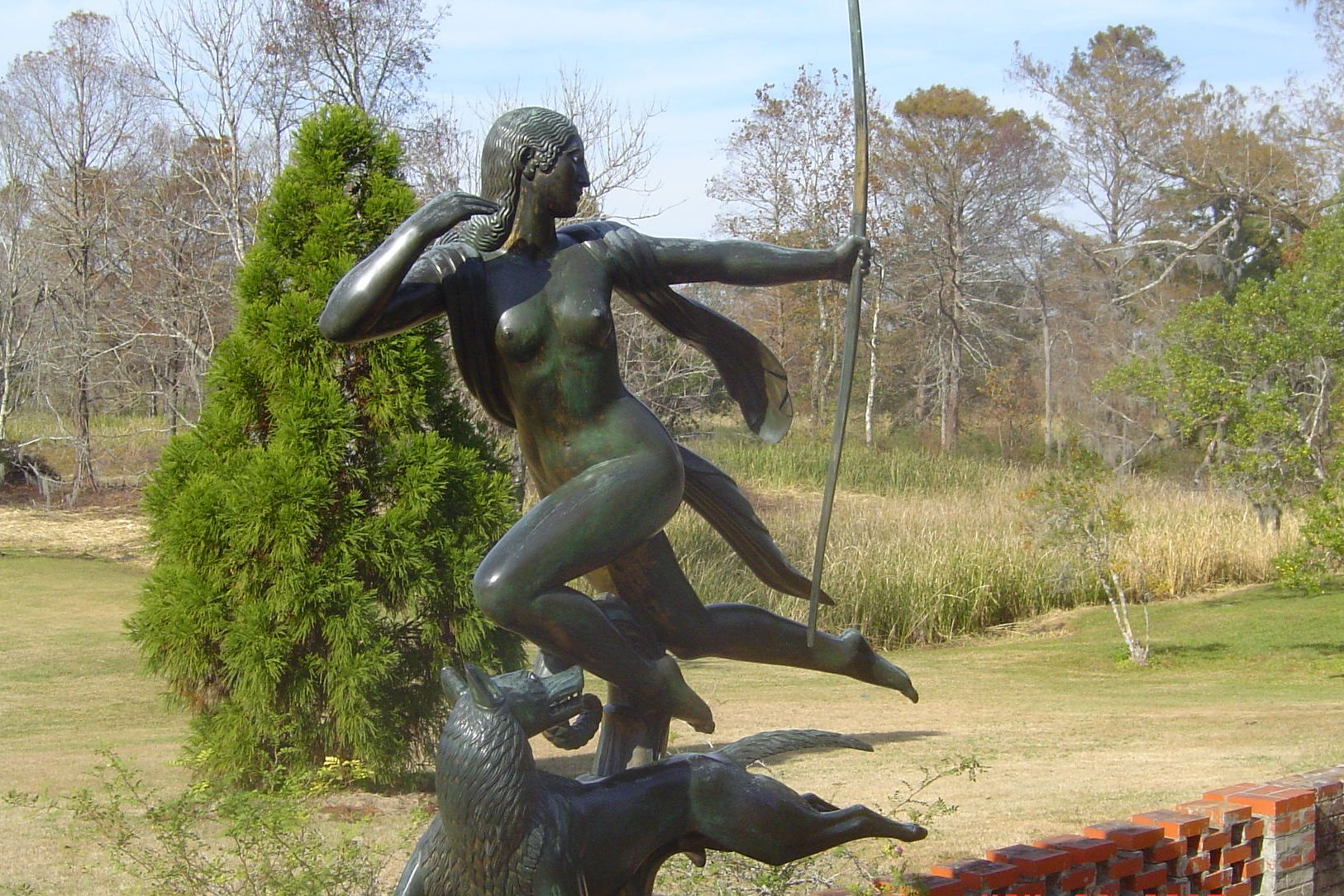
Diana and a Hound, 1924, Brookgreen Gardens, Pawley Island, South Carolina

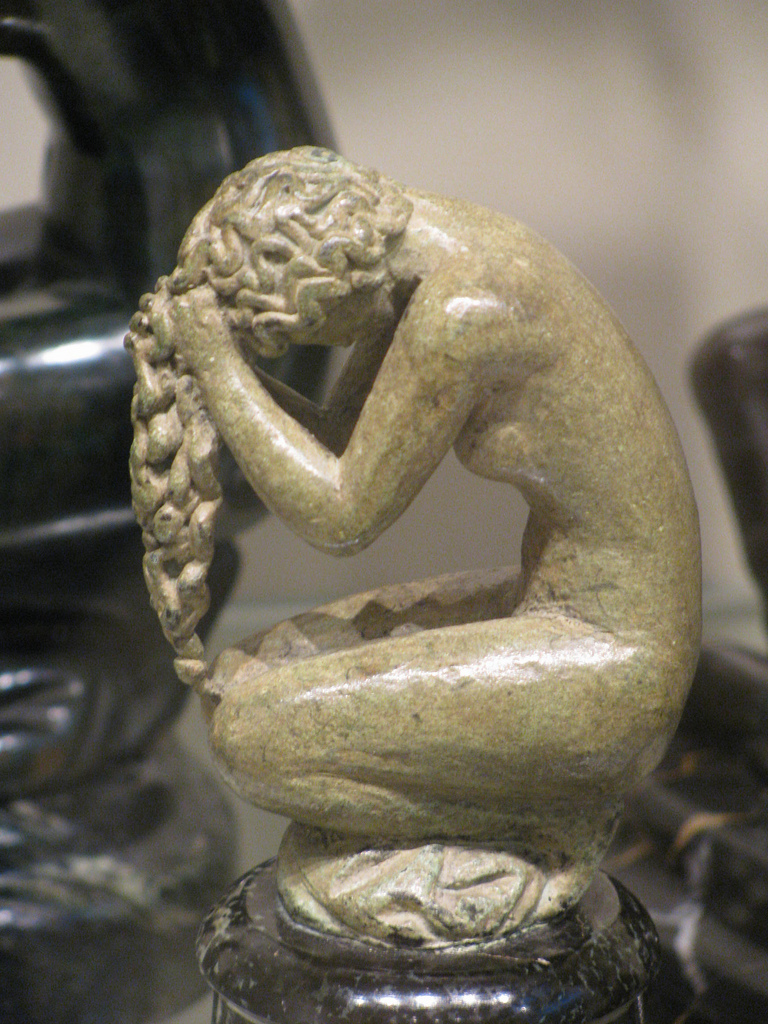
Study for Venus Anadyomene, 1924, Smithsonian American Art Museum, Washington, D.C.

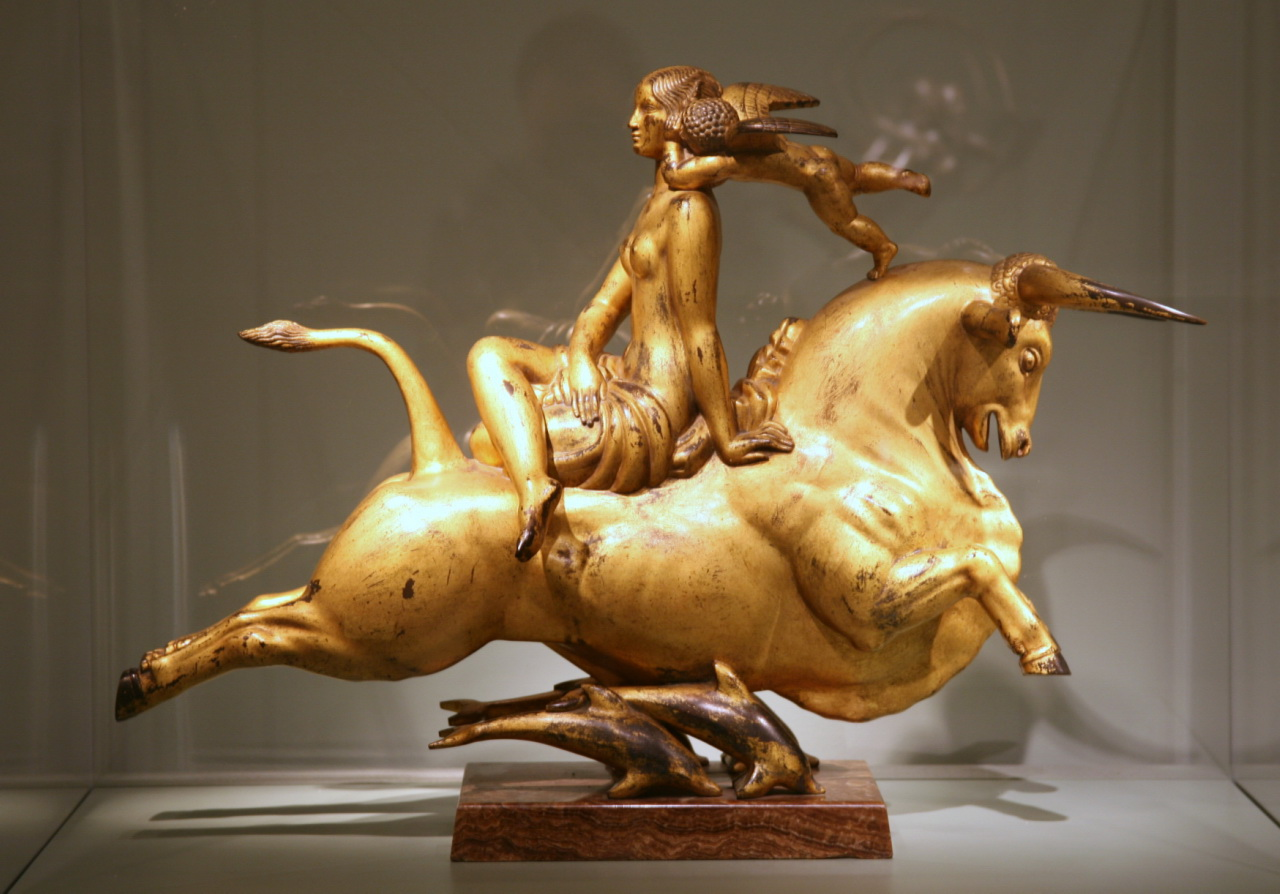
The Flight of Europa, 1925, Smithsonian American Art Museum, Washington, D.C.

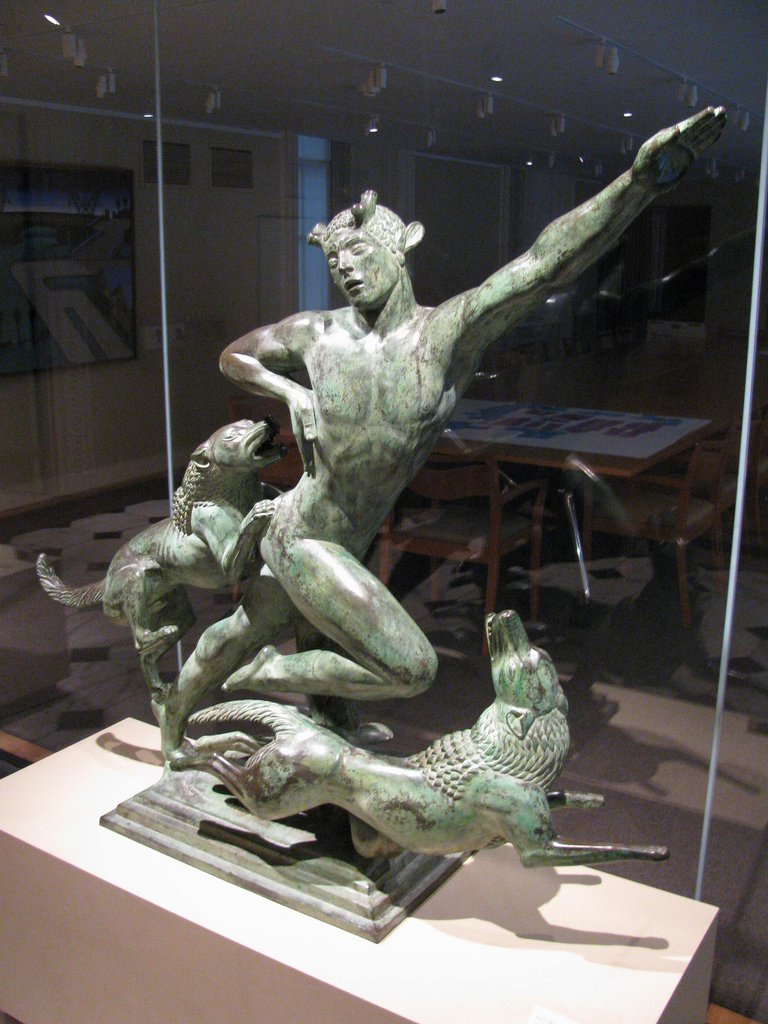
Actaeon (#1), 1925, Smithsonian American Art Museum, Washington, D.C.

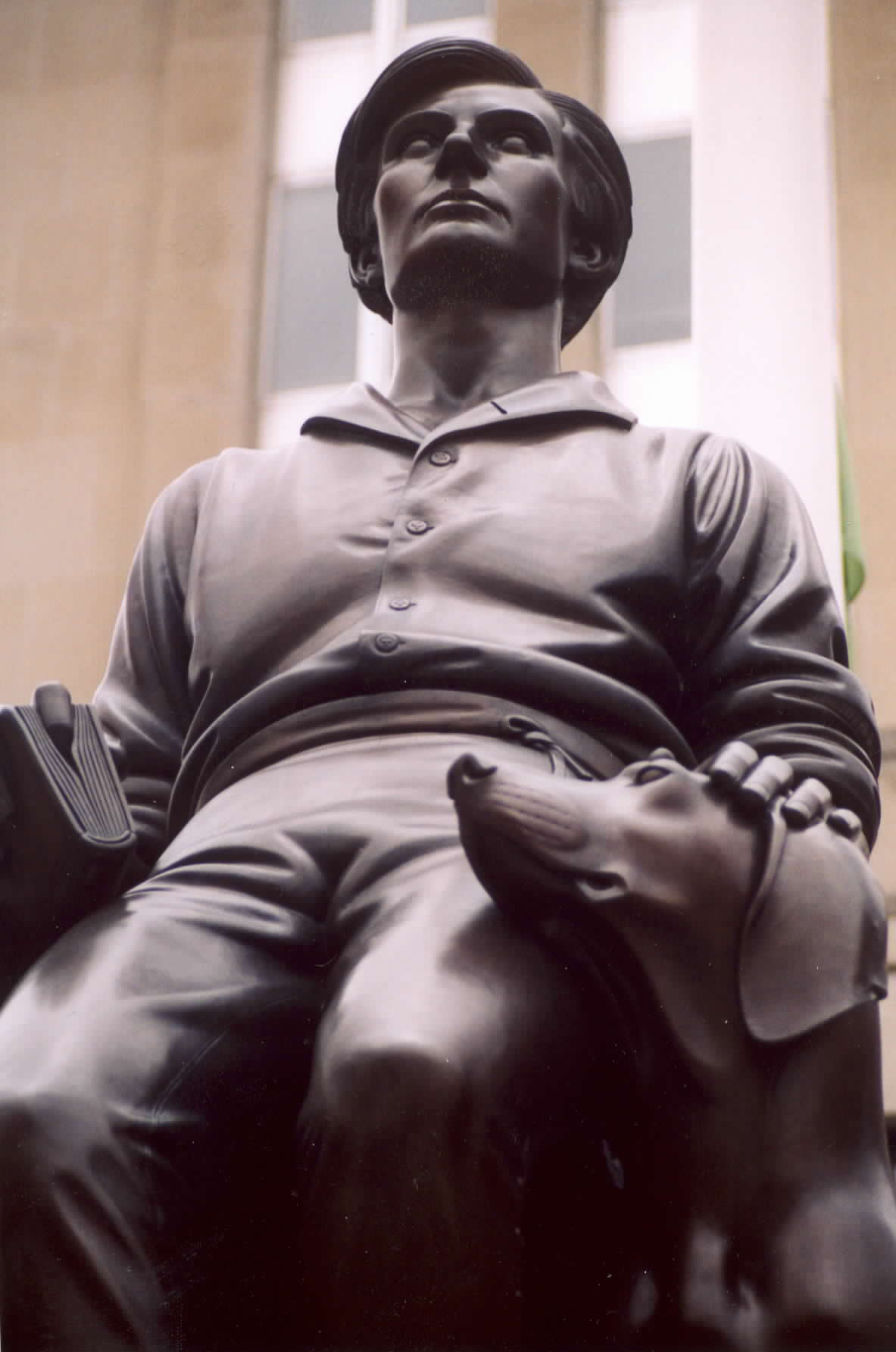
Young Lincoln or Hoosier Youth, 1932, Fort Wayne, Indiana

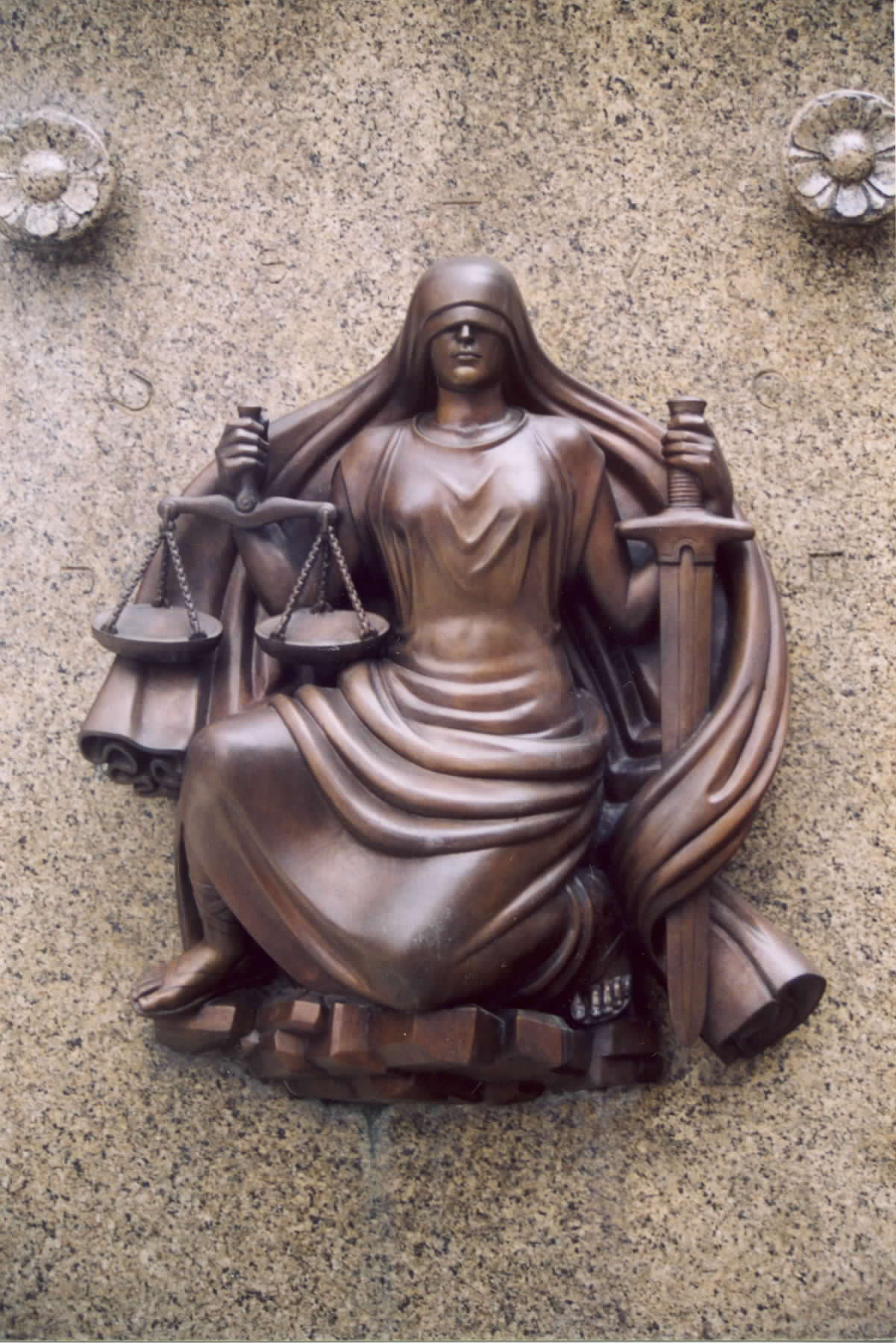
Young Lincoln or Hoosier Youth (detail), 1932, Fort Wayne, Indiana

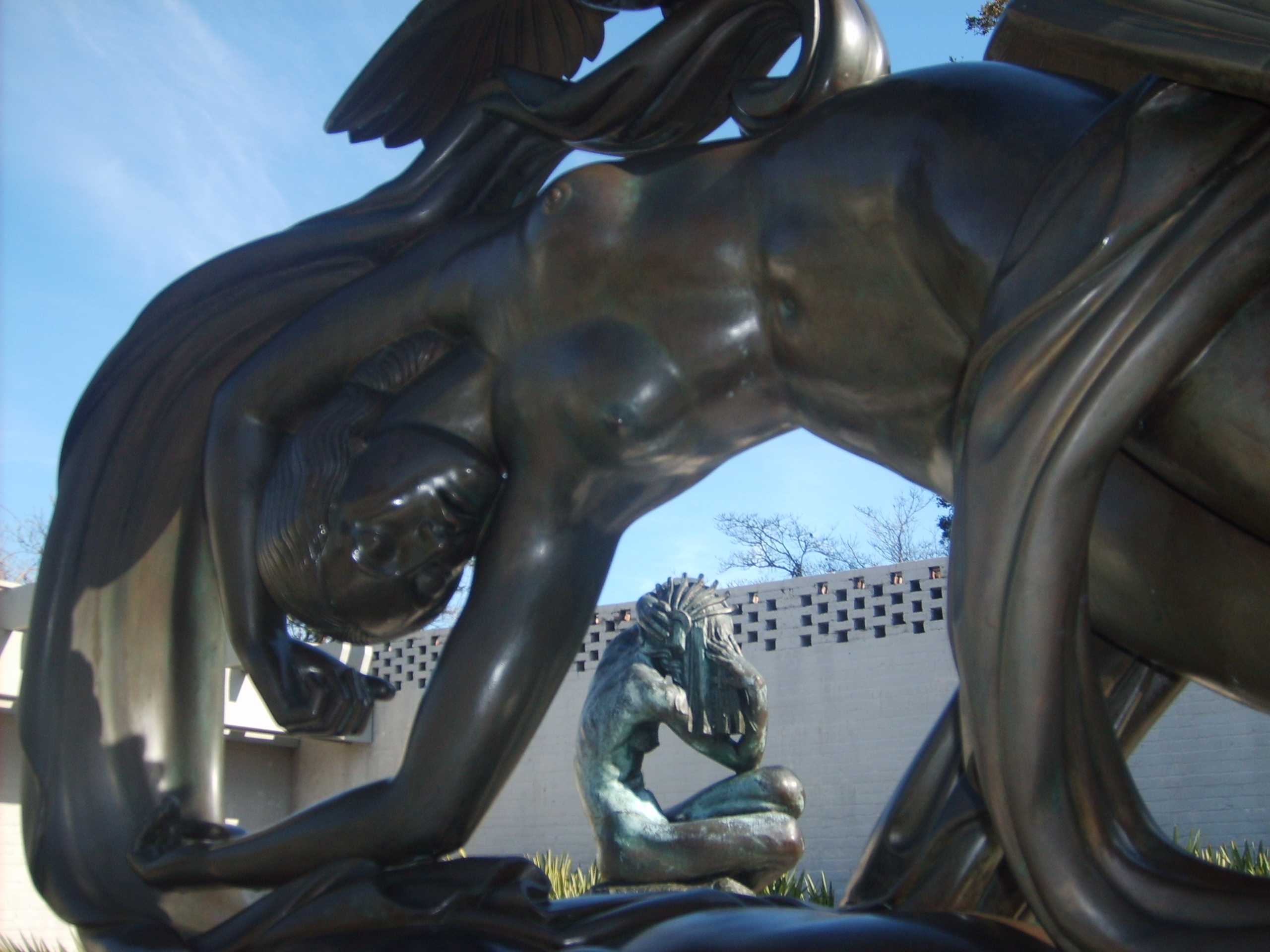
Evening (foreground), 1938, Brookgreen Gardens, Pawley Island, South Carolina

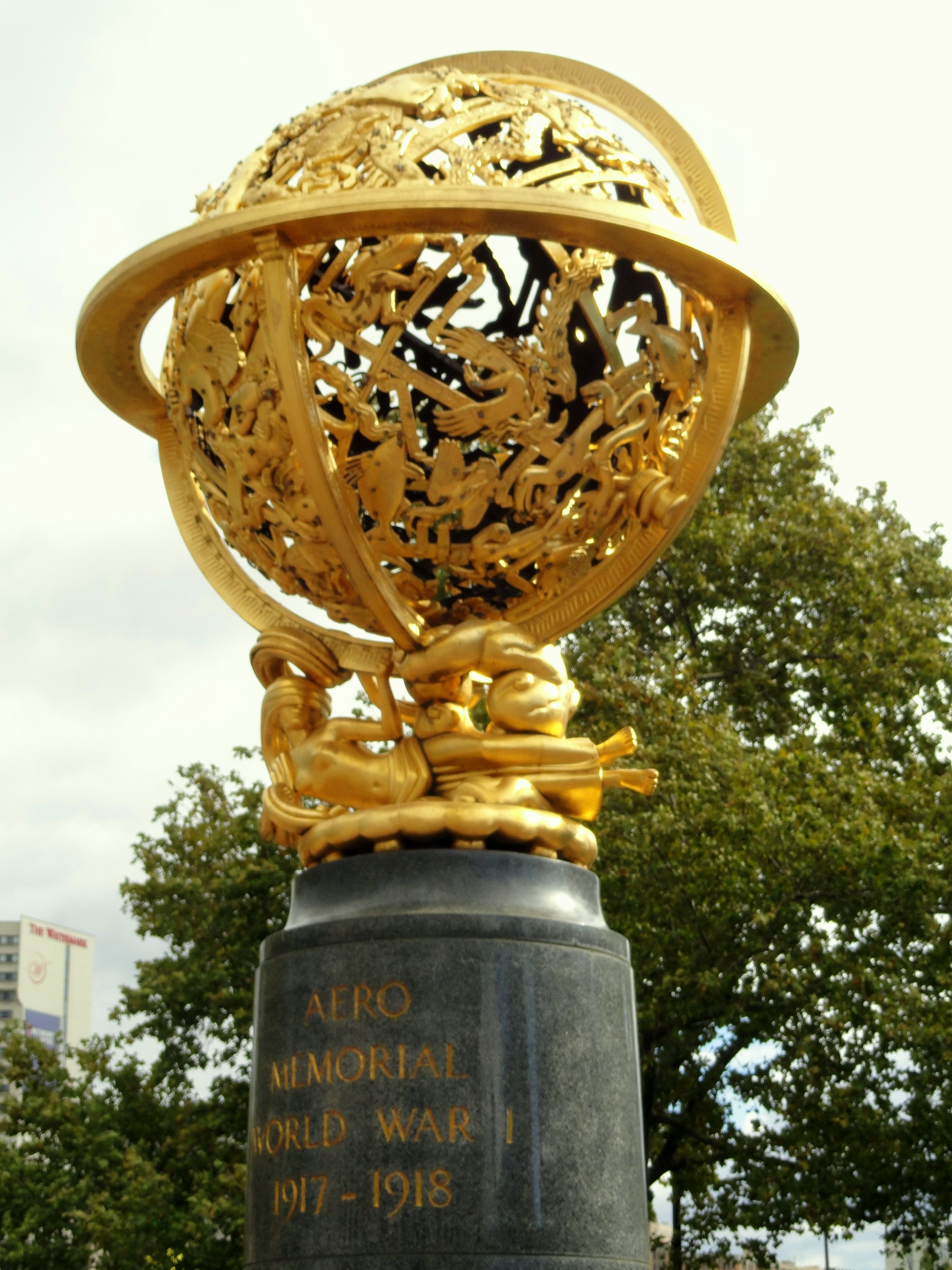
Aero Memorial, 1939–48, Philadelphia, Pennsylvania

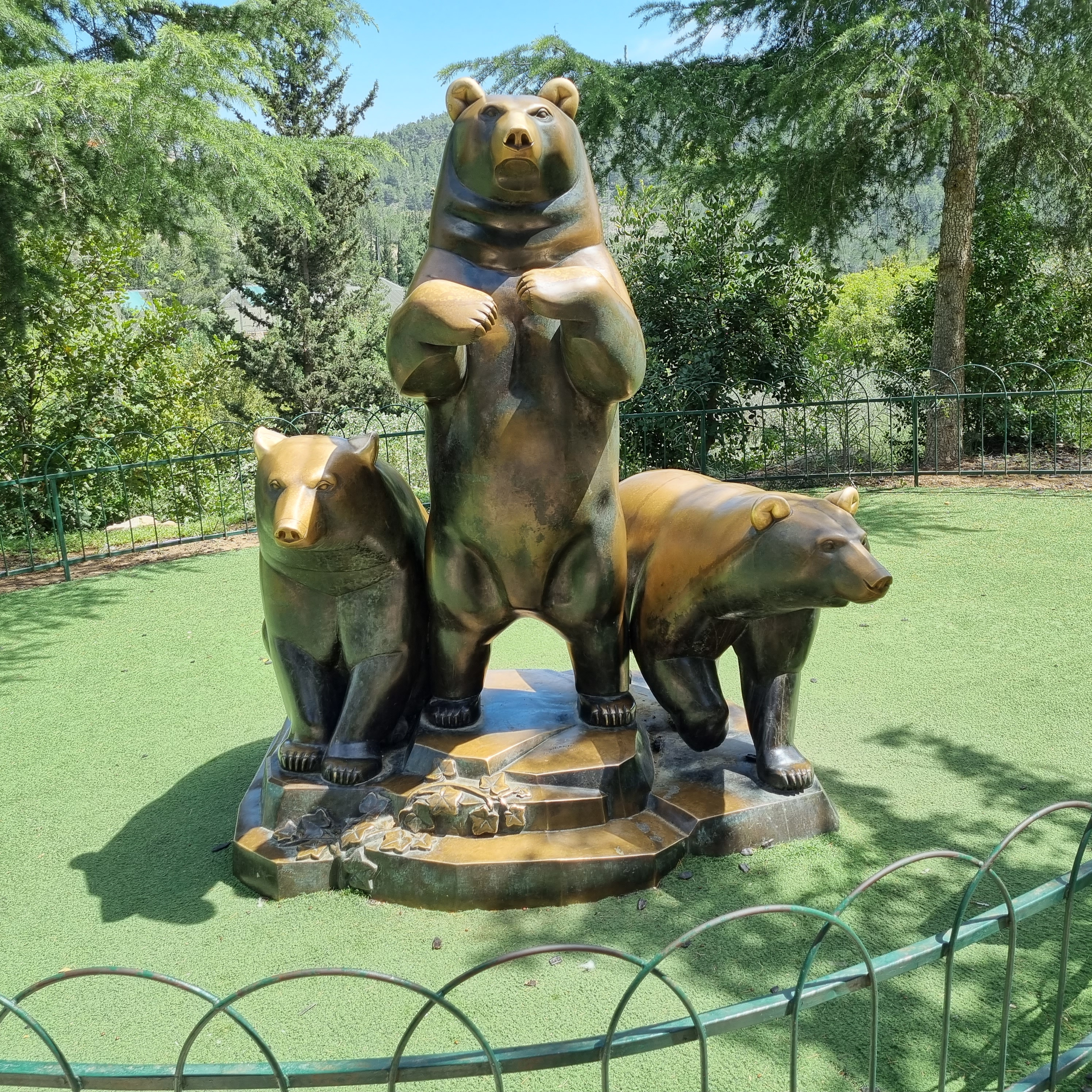
Group of Bears in Jerusalem Biblical Zoo
