= The Indian Hunter =

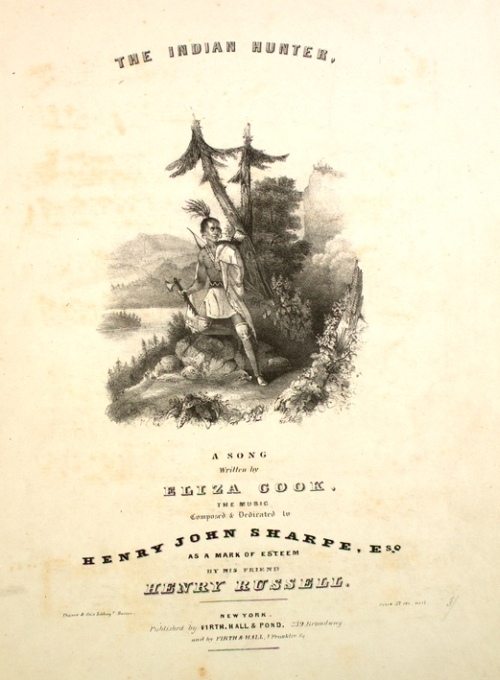
- Cover of sheet music, c. 1842.

Song
- Language: English
- Published: c. 1842
- Composer(s): Henry Russell
- Lyricist(s): Eliza Cook

"The Indian Hunter" is a song based on a poem by Eliza Cook. Music was added by Henry Russell and published in 1842. In the poem, a lament, the hunter is questioning what the white man wants with him and his home.

== Cook's poem ==
"The Indian Hunter", as written by Eliza Cook:

Oh! why does the white man follow my path,

Like the hound on the tiger's track?

Does the blush on my dark cheek waken he wrath?

Doe he covet the bow on my back?

He has rivers and seas, where the billows and breeze

Bear riches for him alone;

And the sons of the wood never plunge in the flood

Which the white man calls his own.

Why then should he come to the streams where none

But the red-skin dare to swim?

Why, why should he wrong the hunter-one,

Who never did harm to him?

The Father above thought fit to give

To the white man corn and wine;

There are golden fields, where they may live,

But the forest shades are mine.

The eagle hath its place of rest,

The wild horse where to dwell;

An the Spirit that gave the bird its nest,

Made me a home as well.

Then back, go back from the red man's track,

For the hunter's eyes grow dim,

To find that the white man wrongs the one

Who never did harm to him.

== Bibliography ==
- Cook, Eliza. The Poetical Works of Eliza Cook. Philadelphia: John Ball (1850)
- Cook, Eliza (w.); Russell, Henry (m.). "The Indian Hunter" (Sheet music). New York: Firth, Hall & Pond (c. 1842).
