= Indian Hunter (Manship) =

Sculpture by Paul Manship

- The sculpture outside the Museum of Fine Arts, Boston, in 2019
- Artist: Paul Manship
- Location: Boston, Massachusetts; Gambier, Ohio
- 42°20′24.4″N 71°5′40.8″W

Indian Hunter is a sculpture by Paul Manship. It depicts a Native American man shooting a bow at a pronghorn antelope.

== Museum of Fine Arts, Boston ==
Indian Hunter is installed outside the Museum of Fine Arts, Boston, in the U.S. state of Massachusetts. The bronze was modeled in 1917 and cast in 2002.

== Kenyon College ==
A bronze casting of the statue also exists on the campus of Kenyon College, in Ohio. The school refers to the sculpture as Indian Hunter & Antelope.
