= Chaim Gross =

American sculptor and educator of Ukrainian Jewish origin (1902–1991)

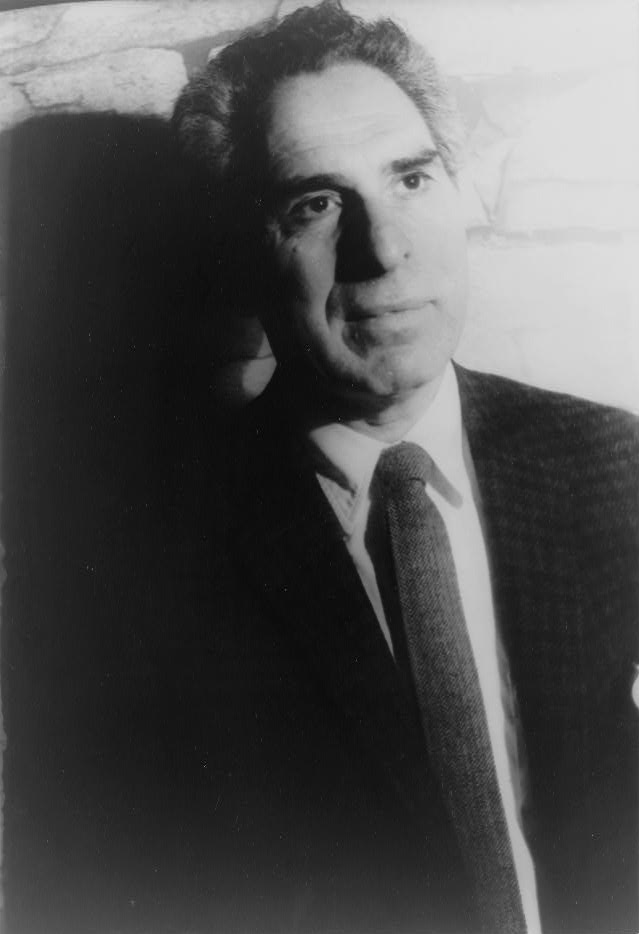
- Gross in 1963
- Born: March 17, 1902; Ökörmező, Kingdom of Hungary
- Died: May 5, 1991 (aged 89); New York City, U.S.
- Education: Beaux-Arts Institute of Design; Art Students League of New York
- Known for: Sculpture, graphic art

Chaim Gross (/xaɪ(ə)m/; March 17, 1902 – May 5, 1991) was an American sculptor and educator of Hungarian Jewish origin. Gross studied and taught at the Educational Alliance Art School in New York City’s Lower Manhattan.

== Childhood ==
Gross was born to a Jewish family in Máramaros County, Kingdom of Hungary, in the village of Ökörmező (now known as Mizhhiria, Ukraine), in the Carpathian Mountains. In 1911, his family moved to Kolomyia (which was annexed into the Ukrainian SSR in 1939 and became part of newly independent Ukraine in 1991). During World War I, Russian forces invaded Austria-Hungary; amidst the turmoil, the Grosses fled Kolomyia. They returned when Austria retook the town in 1915, refugees of the war. When World War I ended, Gross and brother Avrom-Leib went to Budapest to join their older siblings Sarah and Pinkas. Gross applied to and was accepted by the art academy in Budapest and studied under the painter Béla Uitz, though within a year a new regime under Miklós Horthy took over and attempted to expel all Jews and foreigners from the country. After being deported from Hungary, Gross began art studies at the Kunstgewerbeschule in Vienna, Austria, shortly before immigrating to the United States in 1921.

== Emigration from Austria to U.S. ==
Gross' brother Naftoli had arrived in New York City in 1914. He sent money to Chaim and his other brother Avrom-Lieb, the two of whom traveled from Vienna to Le Havre, France, from where they took a boat to New York in March 1921.

== Early career, 1921–1933 ==
Gross's studies continued in the United States at the Beaux-Arts Institute of Design, where he studied with Elie Nadelman and others, and at the Art Students League of New York, with Robert Laurent. He also attended the Educational Alliance Art School, studying under Abbo Ostrowsky, at the same time as Moses Soyer, Raphael Soyer, Adolph Gottlieb, and Peter Blume.

In 1926, Gross began teaching at The Educational Alliance, and continued teaching there for the next 50 years. Louise Nevelson was among his students at the Alliance (in 1934), during the time she was transitioning from painting to sculpture. He also taught Bernard Simon starting in 1938.

Gross began exhibiting sculpture in group shows of students at the Educational Alliance, and then at the Jewish Art Center in the Bronx. In the late 1920s and early 1930s, he exhibited at the Salons of America exhibitions at the Anderson Galleries and, beginning in 1928, at the Whitney Studio Club (the precursor to the Whitney Museum of American Art).

In 1929, Gross experimented with printmaking, and created an important group of 15 linocuts and lithographs of landscapes, New York City streets and parks, women in interiors, the circus, and vaudeville. The entire suite is now in the collection of the Philadelphia Museum of Art. Gross returned to the medium of printmaking in the 1960s, and produced approximately 200 works in the medium over the next two decades.

In March 1932, Gross had his first solo exhibition at Gallery 144 in New York City. For a short time they represented Gross, as well as his friends Milton Avery, Moses Soyer, Ahron Ben-Shmuel and others.

Gross was primarily a practitioner of the direct carving method, with the majority of his work being carved from wood. Other direct carvers in early 20th-century American art include William Zorach, Jose de Creeft, and Robert Laurent. Works by Chaim Gross can be found in major museums and private collections throughout the United States, with substantial holdings (27 sculptures) at the Hirshhorn Museum and Sculpture Garden. A key work from this era, now at the Smithsonian American Art Museum, is the 1932 birds-eye maple Acrobatic Performers, which is also only one and one quarter inch thick. His work was also part of the sculpture event in the art competition at the 1932 Summer Olympics.

== Maturity, 1933–1957 ==
In 1933, Gross joined the U.S. government's Public Works of Art Project (PWAP), which transitioned into the Works Progress Administration (WPA), which Gross worked for later in the 1930s. Under these programs Gross taught and demonstrated art, made sculptures that were placed in schools and public colleges, made work for Federal buildings including the Federal Trade Commission Building, and for the France Overseas and Finnish Buildings at the 1939 New York World's Fair. Gross was also recognized during these years with a silver medal at the Exposition universelle de 1937 in Paris, and in 1942, with a purchase prize at the Metropolitan Museum of Art's "Artists for Victory" exhibition for his wood sculpture of famed circus performer Lillian Leitzel.

In 1938, filmmaker and historian Lewis Jacobs made a 30-minute feature of Gross carving, called Tree Trunk to Head, showing Gross at work in his East Village studio on a portrait of his wife Renee (/riːni/), who models in the film.

In 1949, Gross sketched Chaim Weizmann, president of Israel, at several functions in New York City where Weizmann was speaking. Gross began a portrait in clay and then traveled to Israel in the summer of that year hoping to be able to meet Weizmann and have him sit for a portrait. Weizmann was too ill, but Gross completed the bust in bronze later that year. Gross returned to Israel for three months in 1951 (the second of many trips there in the postwar years) to paint a series of 40 watercolors of life in various cities. This series was exhibited at Manhattan's Jewish Museum in 1953.

Chaim Gross, Sculptor by Josef Vincent Lombardo, the first major book on Gross, came out in 1949. It included a catalogue raisonne of his sculpture.

In the 1950s, Gross began to make more bronze sculptures alongside his wood and stone pieces, and in 1957 and 1959 he traveled to Rome to work with famed bronze foundries including the Nicci foundry. At the end of the decade, Gross was working primarily in bronze, which allowed him to create open forms, large-scale works and of course, multiple casts. Gross's large-scale bronze The Family, donated to New York City in 1991 in honor of Mayor Ed Koch, and installed at the Bleecker Street Park at 11th Street, is now a fixture of Greenwich Village.

== Later career, 1957–1991 ==
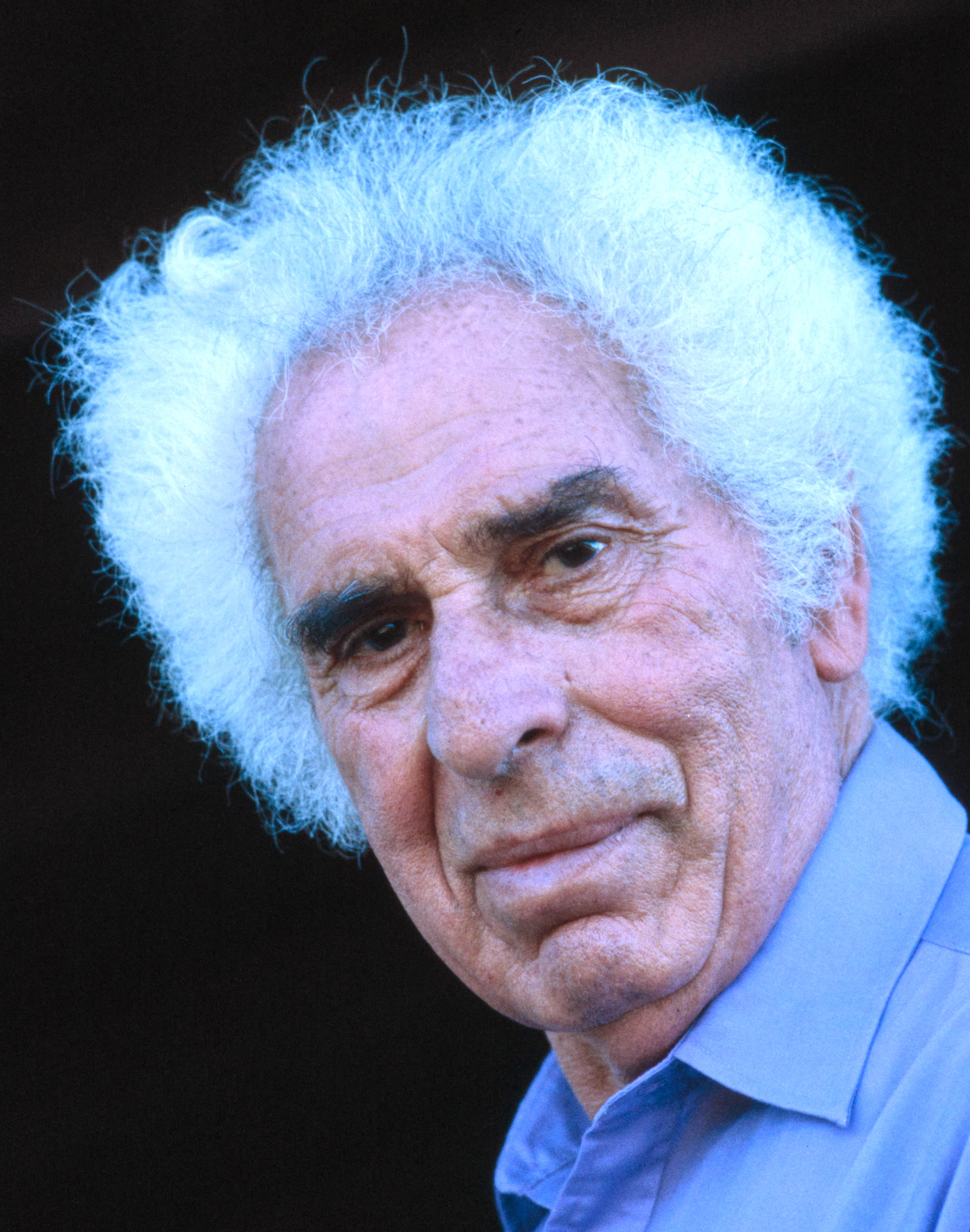
Gross in 1983

In 1957, Gross published The Techniques of Wood Sculpture, an influential how-to book with photographs of him at work by famed photographer Eliot Elisofon. In 1959, a survey of Gross's sculpture in wood, stone, and bronze was featured in the exhibit Four American Expressionists curated by Lloyd Goodrich at the Whitney Museum of American Art, with work by Abraham Rattner, Doris Caesar, and Karl Knaths. In 1963, Gross and his family moved from their longtime residence at 30 W 105th Street to Greenwich Village, following the purchase of a four-story historic townhouse and studio at 526 LaGuardia Place. The townhouse is now the Renee and Chaim Gross Foundation, winner of a 2015 Village Award from the Greenwich Village Society for Historic Preservation, and open to the public.

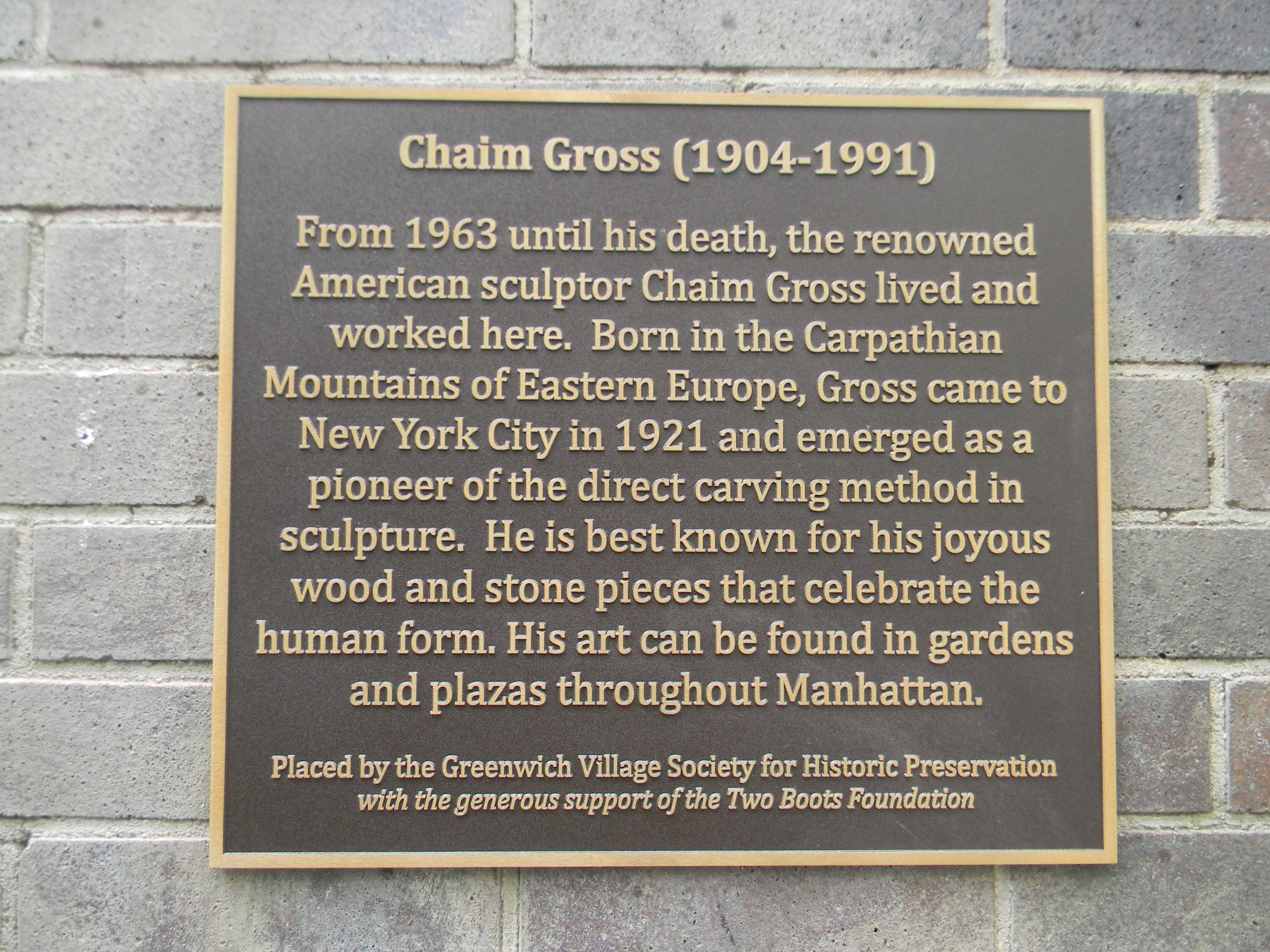
This is the Historic Plaque unveiled on October 6, 2016 by Greenwich Village Society for Historic Preservation at 526 LaGuardia Place.

In 1974, the Smithsonian American Art Museum held the exhibition, Chaim Gross: Sculpture and Drawings, organized by Janet A. Flint, Smithsonian Curator of Prints and Drawings. In 1976, a selection from Gross's important collection of historic African sculpture, formed since the late 1930s, was exhibited at the Worcester Art Museum in the show The Sculptor's Eye: The African Art Collection of Mr. and Mrs. Chaim Gross.

In 1977, Gross had three retrospective exhibitions: at the Lowe Art Museum at the University of Miami, followed by the Montclair Art Museum; and the Jewish Museum in Manhattan. The Jewish Museum's exhibition catalog featured an important essay on Gross by art historian and modern American sculpture specialist Roberta K. Tarbell, Professor Emeritus at Rutgers University.

Gross received multiple honorary doctorates in the 1970s and 80s: from Franklin & Marshall College (1970); Yeshiva University (1978); Adelphi University (1980); Hebrew Union College (1984); and Brooklyn College (1986). In 1979, Gross was elected into the National Academy of Design as an Associate member, and became a full Academician in 1981. In 1984, he was inducted into the American Academy of Arts and Letters, with Jacob Lawrence and Lukas Foss. Gross died at Beth Israel Hospital in May 1991 and was buried at Mount Lebanon Cemetery in Queens, New York. In the fall of 1991, Allen Ginsberg gave an important tribute to Gross at the American Academy of Arts and Letters, which is published in their Proceedings. In 1994, Forum Gallery, which now represents the Chaim Gross estate, held a memorial exhibition featuring a sixty-year survey of Gross's work.

== Teaching ==
Gross was a professor of printmaking and sculpture at both the Educational Alliance and the New School for Social Research in New York City, as well as at the Brooklyn Museum Art School, the MoMA art school, the Art Student's League and the New Art School (which Gross ran briefly with Alexander Dobkin, Raphael Soyer and Moses Soyer).

Gross was a member of the New York Artists Equity Association and the Federation of Modern Painters and Sculptors. He was a founder and served as the first president of the Sculptors Guild.

== Personal life ==
Gross summered for many years in Provincetown, Massachusetts.

In 1932, Gross married Renee Nechin (/riːni/; d. 2005), and they had two children, Yehuda and Mimi. Mimi Gross is a New York-based artist. She was married to the artist Red Grooms from 1963-1976. When Gross died in 1991, Allen Ginsberg wrote a tribute to his life, which ended in a quote that reads: "So he's [Gross] now sitting drinking tea with old acquaintances, Marc Chagall, Pablo Picasso, & the Soyer Boys in heaven or whatever Shul their shades attend."

== Gallery ==
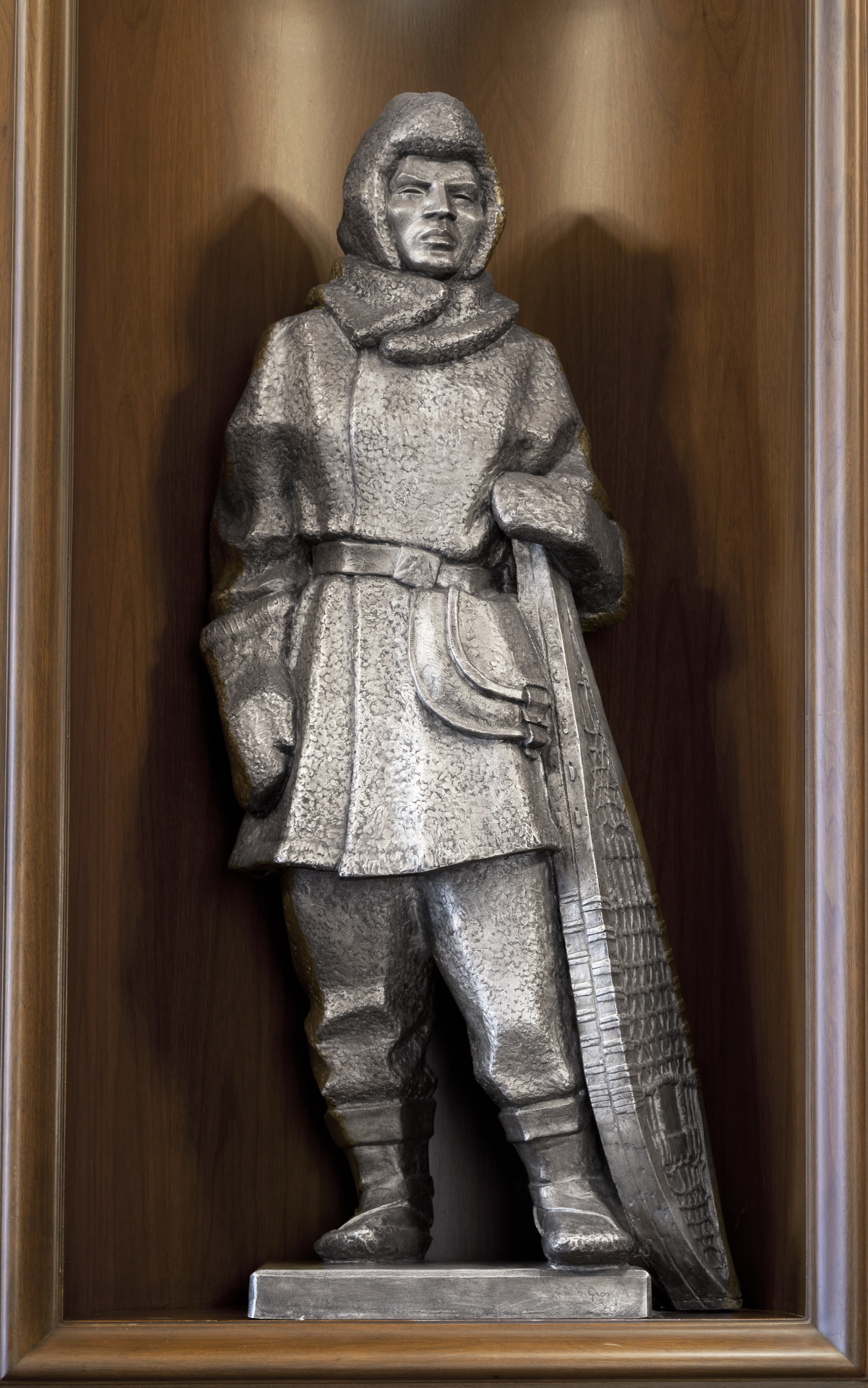
Alaska Snowshoe Carrier, 1936. Ariel Rios Federal Building, Washington, D.C.

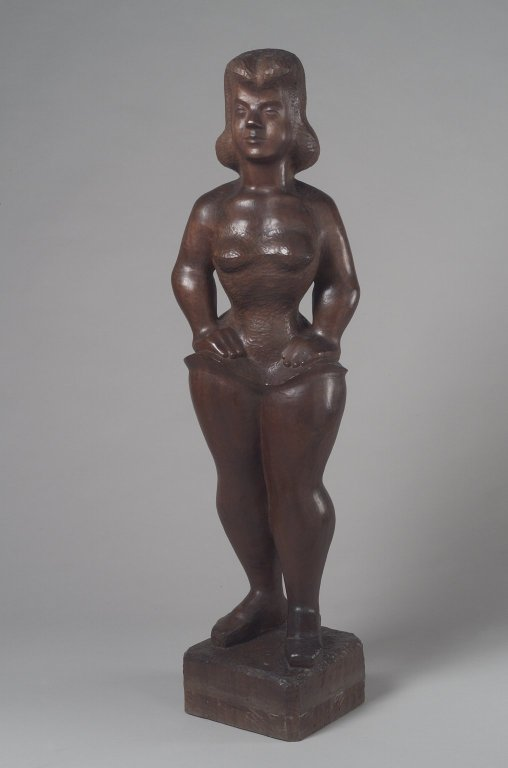
Ballerina, 1940. Brooklyn Museum.

== Selected museum collections ==
- Brooklyn Museum
- Metropolitan Museum of Art
- Norton Museum of Art
- Pennsylvania Academy of the Fine Arts
- Philadelphia Museum of Art
- Smithsonian American Art Museum
- Wadsworth Atheneum
- Whitney Museum

== See also ==
- Chaim Gross A Celebration / American Art
