= The Family (Gross) =

Sculpture in Manhattan, New York, U.S.

- The sculpture in 2014
- Artist: Chaim Gross
- Type: Sculpture
- Medium: Bronze
- Location: New York City, New York, United States; 40.73603°N 74.00525°W

The Family is an outdoor bronze sculpture by American artist and educator Chaim Gross, installed at the Bleecker Playground in Manhattan, New York City.

== Description and history ==
Chaim Gross' The Family is installed at West 11th Street and Bleecker Street. The bronze sculpture was cast in 1979 and dedicated on May 27, 1992. Karahan Schwarting Architectural Co. is credited as the architect and Bedi-Makky Art Foundry served as the foundry; Lithos International is credited as the pedestal's fabricator. It depicts a family of five and includes two large and three small figures. According to the New York City Department of Parks & Recreation, "The adults are reaching up, as if towards the sky, as they support three children in their hands. The adult figures float gracefully and symmetrically, portraying a harmonious family unit." The sculpture is 7 feet, 6 inches tall and wide. It rests on a Carnelian red granite pedestal that measures 6 feet tall and 4 feet wide, with a diameter of 3 feet. An inscription reads, "THE FAMILY / 1979 / CHAIM GROSS /---/ DONATED TO THE CITY OF NEW YORK, 1991 / IN HONOR OF / EDWARD I. KOCH / MAYOR 1978–1989".

== See also ==
- 1979 in art
