= Bernard Simon =

Russian-American modernist sculptor (1896–1980)

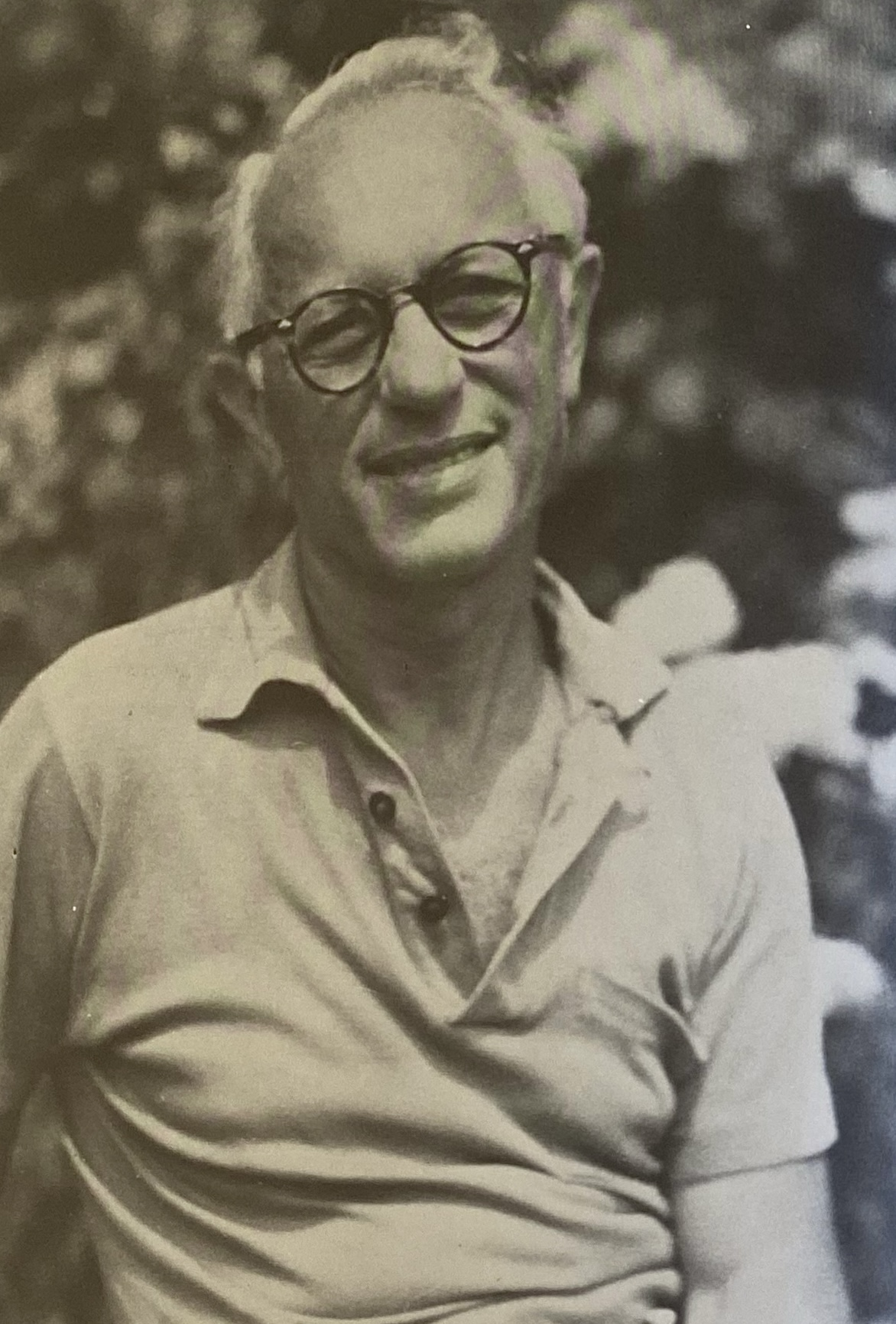
- Born: January 6, 1896; Yedinitz, Bessarabia, Russia
- Died: January 1980 (aged 83–84); New York City
- Education: Educational Alliance, New York, New School for Social Research, New York
- Style: Modernist, Figurative, Abstract expressionism
- Spouse: Edna Simon

Signature
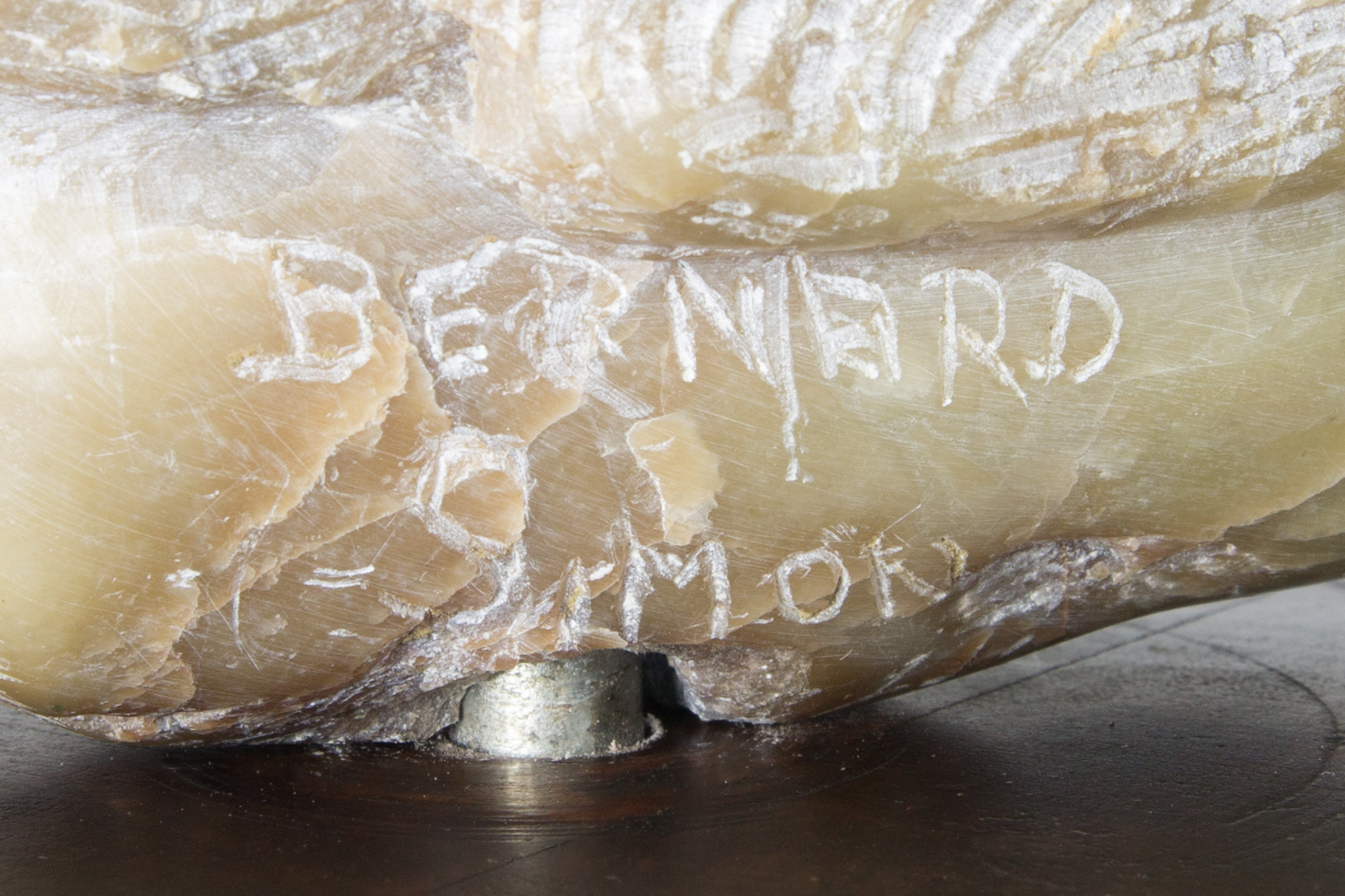

Bernard Simon (1896–1980) was a modernist sculptor from Yedinitz, Bessarabia. He came to New York in 1912 and was part of a Jewish community of artists in Brooklyn. Simon taught sculpture at the Bayonne Art Center, N.J., the Educational Alliance, N.Y., the Museum of Modern Art, N.Y., and at the New School for Social Research, N.Y. His sculptures were figurative during a period when abstract expressionism was dominant, in the 1950s. He participated in many cooperative artists organizations.

== Biography ==
Bernard Simon (1896-1980) was raised in Yedinitz, a village in former Bessarabia under Soviet control. Simon's father died when he was 12 years old. In 1912, Simon's mother sent him to New York to avoid Russia's draft for the impending World War. In the city, Simon worked at the family laundry and in sales. With his wife, Edna, he had a daughter, Ruth. .

However, in the Great Depression took hold, his businesses struggled. Simon turned to sculpture, and had a long career of teaching, making, and exhibiting, until his death in New York City in 1980.

== Career ==
In 1938, Simon began studying with Chaim Gross at the Educational Alliance, New York. Simon and Gross became friends and starting in 1945, Simon spent summers at the art colony in Provincetown, Massachusetts.

In the early 1950s, Simon spent a decade as the Vice President, Treasurer, and Board Member of the New York Artists Equity Association, which was founded in 1947 by 160 artists including Edward Hopper and Yasuo Kuniyoshi. Simon tried to "influence [the organization's] future in protection of artists in a world where patronage no longer exists." The association opened the Broome Street Gallery and exhibited work by notable artists including Noguchi, Willem de Kooning, and Chaim Gross.

By 1977, Simon had exhibited his sculpture in 40 one-man shows. He regularly exhibited in the Silvermine Guild gallery's group shows, in 1958 with Minna Hirkavy, and in 1959 alongside the realist painter, Elizabeth Barker. He showed work in the National Exhibition of the Sarasota Art Association in 1960; the outdoor exhibition at Mari Gallery (Woodstock, New York) in 1961, the Berryman Galleries in Endicott, New York in 1969, and in exhibitions sponsored by the artists' associations to which he belonged. Simon's sculpture, El Torro, is featured in the permanent Provincetown Art Collection. His work was also shown at the Whitney Museum of American Art in New York and the Museum of Natural History in New York.

=== Memberships ===
- Allied Artists of America
- American Society of Contemporary Artists
- Artists Equity Association - Treasurer, Vice President, and member of the Board of Directors
- Cape Cod Art Association
- Provincetown Art Asocciation, Massachusetts
- Silvermine Guild of Artists

== Awards ==
Simon won American Contemporary Art Gallery awards in 1949 and 1952. He also received awards from the Artists Equity Association, Audubon Artists, the Painters and Sculptors Society of New Jersey, the Silvermine Guild, and Knickerbocker Artists. He is represented in a variety of private collections.

=== Permanent Collections ===
- Chrysler Museum of Art, Norfolk, Va.
- Everson Museum of Art, Syracuse, N.Y.
- Fairleigh Dickenson University, N.J.
- Harvard Art Museums, Fogg Museum, Boston, Mass.
- Heritage Museum, Provincetown, Mass.
- Slater Memorial Museum, Norwich, Conn.

=== Reviews ===
- The New York Times
- The New York Herald Tribune
- The New York Post, Emily Gennauer
- The Miami Herald

== Gallery ==
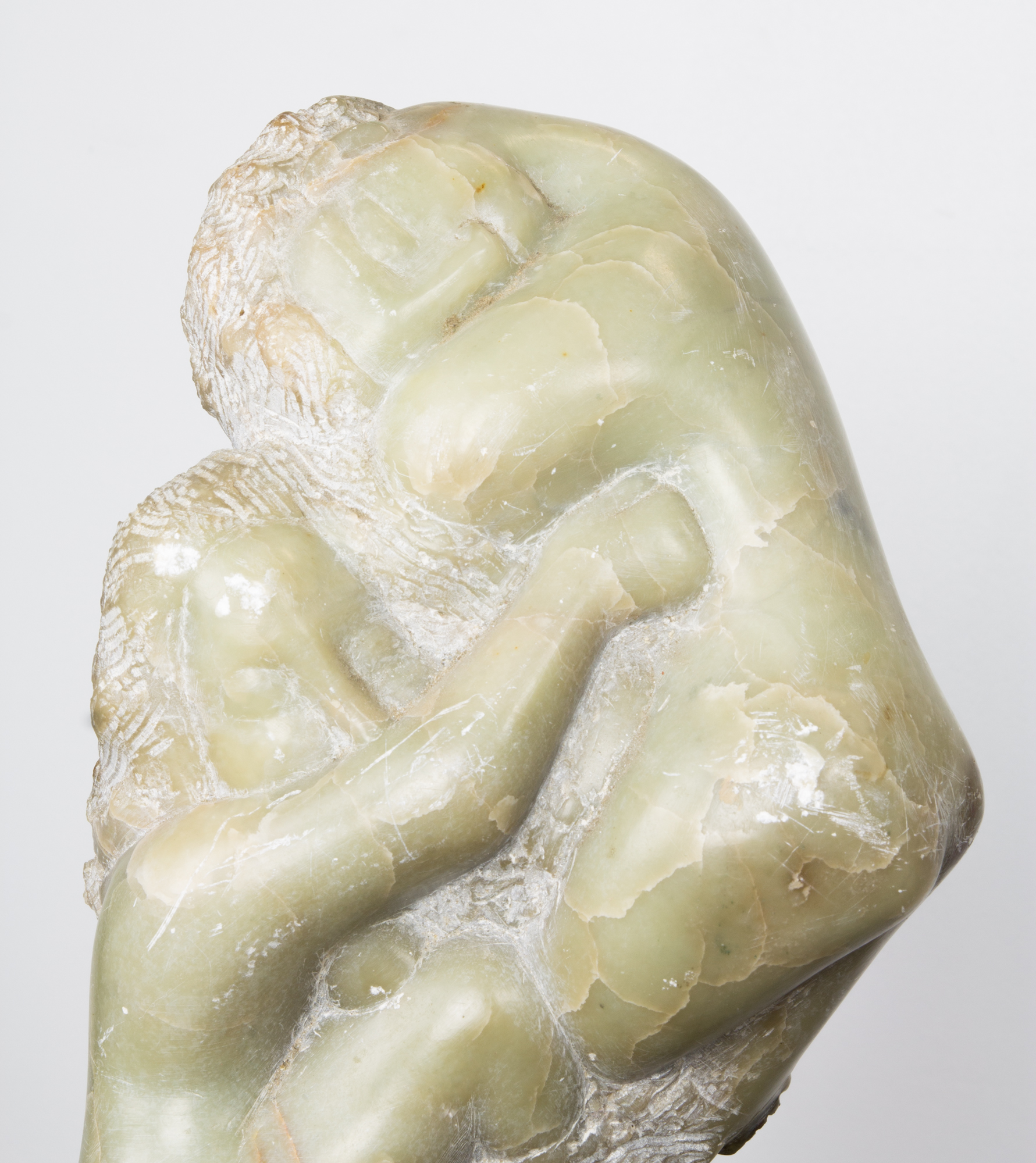
Lover's Embrace, Bernard Simon, Front Close Up

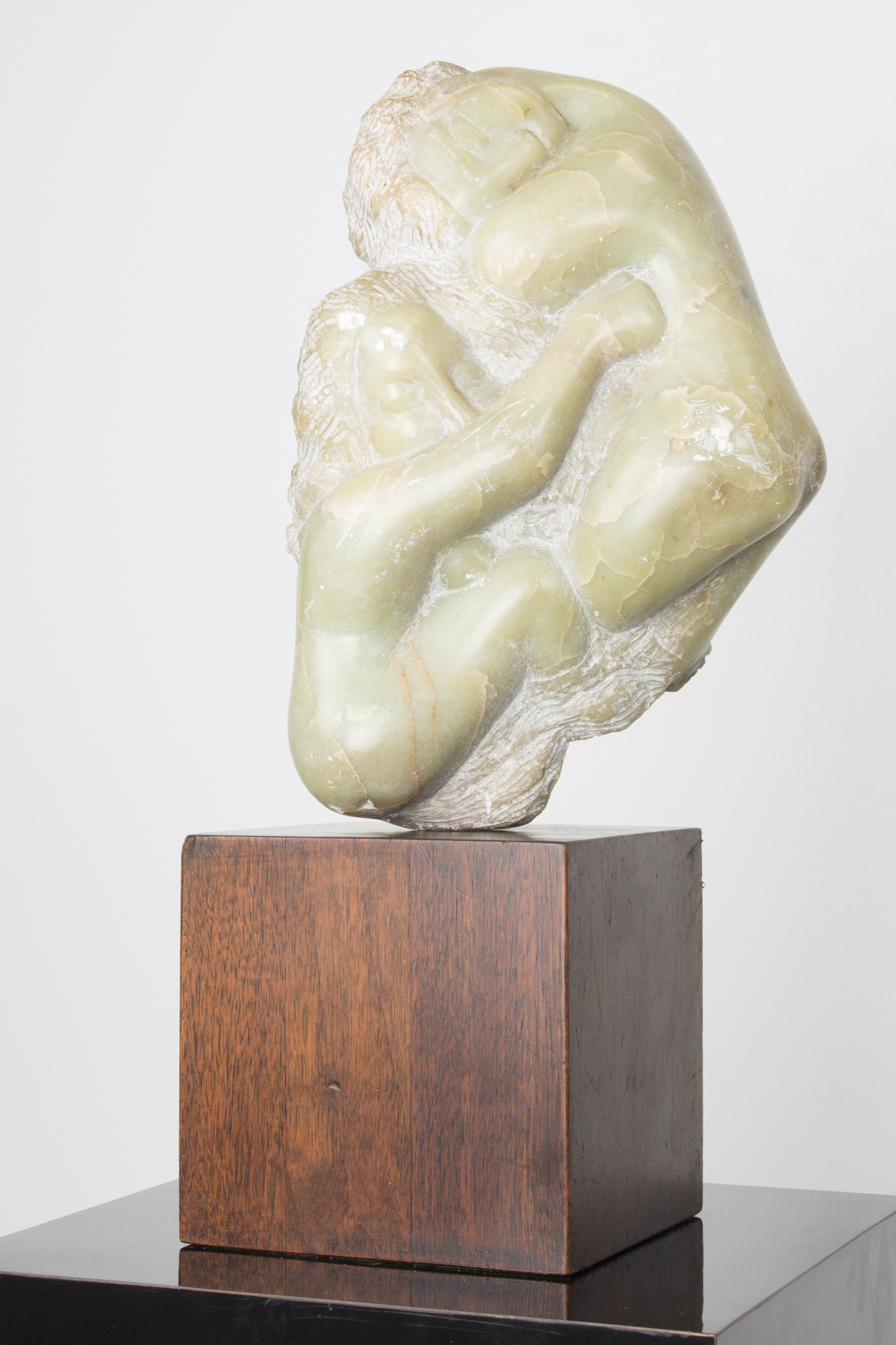
Lover's Embrace, Bernard Simon, Front

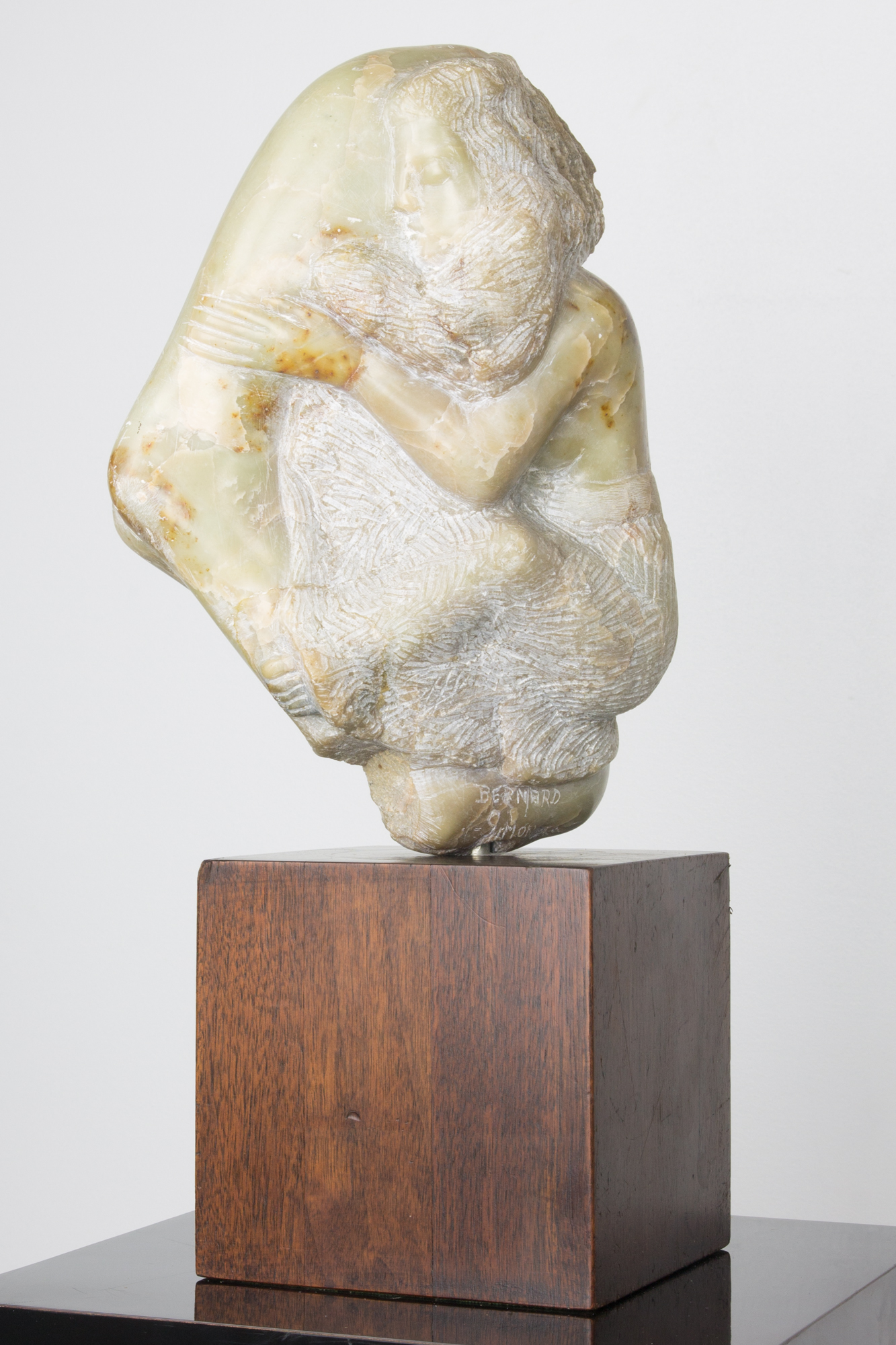
Lover's Embrace, Bernard Simon, Back
