= Louis Eilshemius =

American painter

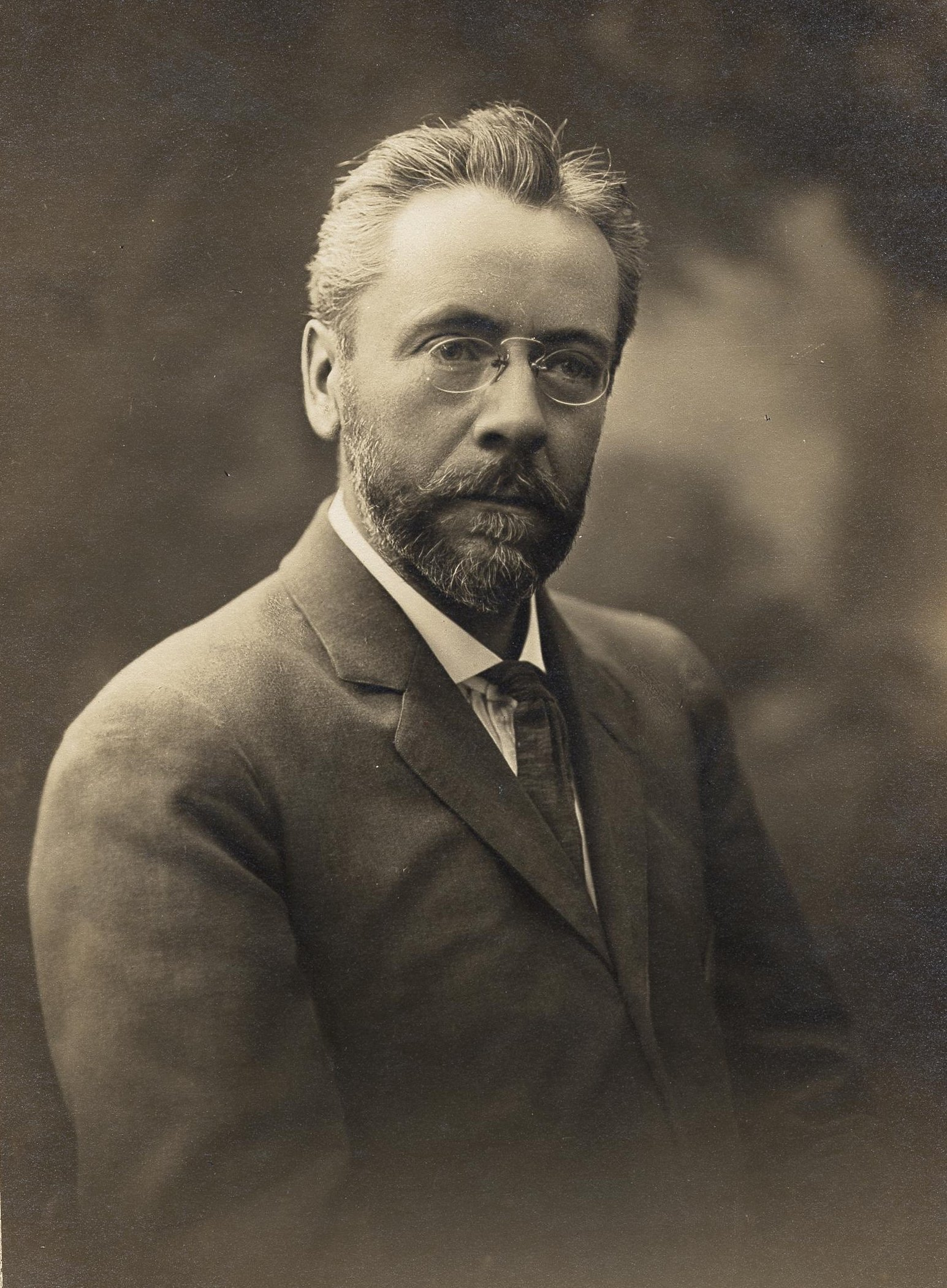
- Born: February 4, 1864; Newark, New Jersey
- Died: December 29, 1941 (aged 77)
- Known for: Painting

Louis Michel Eilshemius (February 4, 1864 – December 29, 1941) was an American painter, primarily of landscapes and nudes. He also wrote musical compositions, verse, novels, short stories, and published periodicals.

== Biography ==
Eilshemius was the son of a Dutch father and a Swiss mother. His wealthy family lived near Newark, New Jersey. He was educated in Europe, after which he spent two years at Cornell University before beginning his art studies at the Art Students League of New York. He also studied privately with the American landscape painter Robert Crannell Minor (1839-1904). He subsequently studied under Bouguereau at the Académie Julian in Paris and traveled widely in Europe, Africa and the South Seas, returning to the family brownstone in New York City where he was to live for the rest of his life.

His early landscapes, which show the influence of the Barbizon School and of Corot, George Inness and Albert Pinkham Ryder gained him little recognition from critics or the public. Around 1910, the element of fantasy in his work became more pronounced and his technique became coarser; henceforth, he often painted on cardboard instead of canvas. As his works became more idiosyncratic, so did his behavior, and he developed an unsettling habit of visiting galleries and loudly condemning the works on display.

His later, visionary works depicting moonlit landscapes populated with voluptuous nymphs caused his contemporaries particular consternation, due to their crudely rendered and often extravagantly smiling nudes. These are shown frolicking in forests or waterfalls, either alone or in groups, sometimes defying gravity by floating through the air. His paintings of New York rooftops are as lyrical as his pastoral scenes, and like them are often bounded by sinuous "frames" he painted onto his pictures.

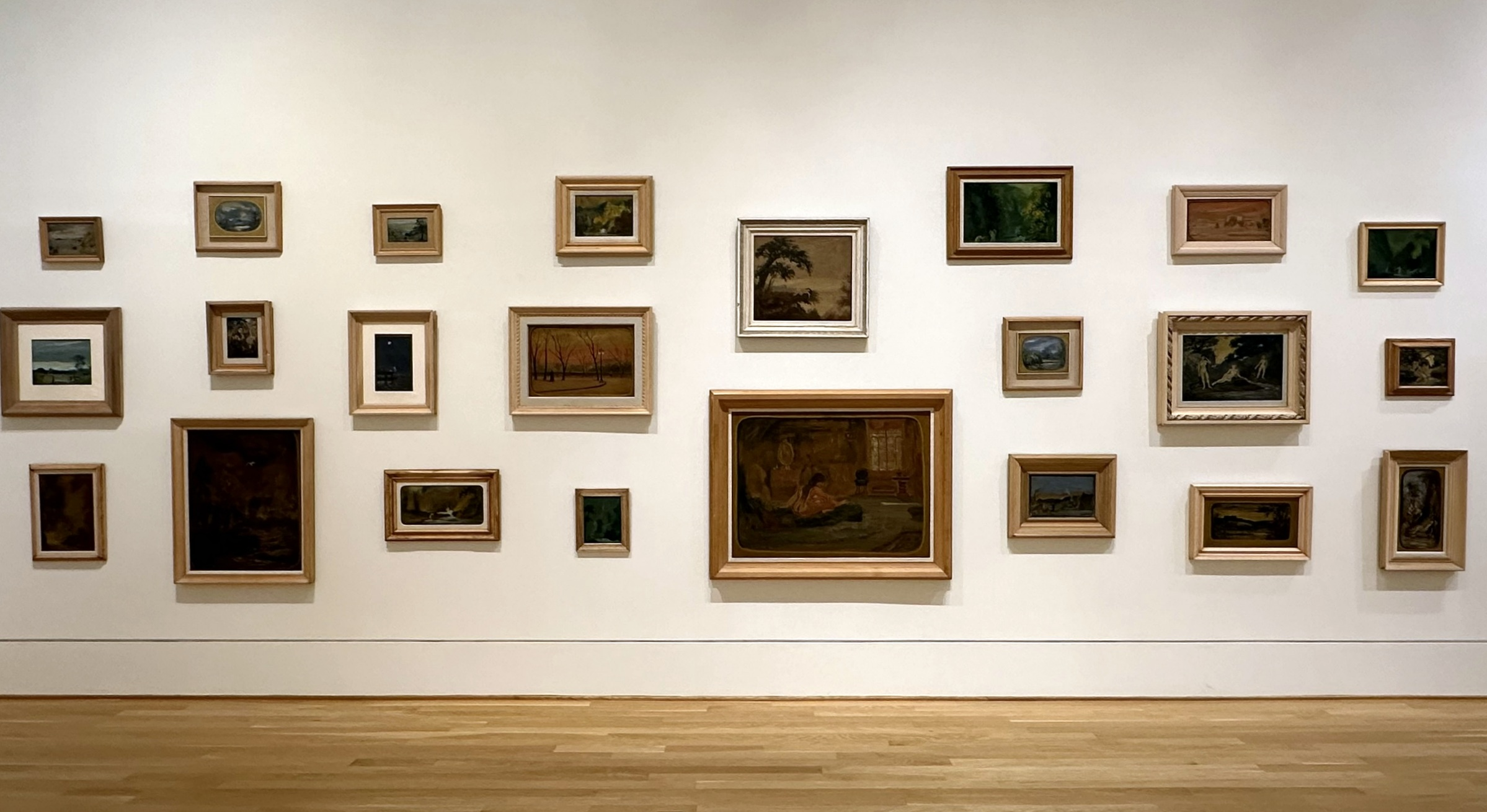
Eilshemius paintings at an exhibit of his works at The Phillips Collection

Eilshemius also wrote verse and prose, composed music, painted, philosophized and became notorious for his numerous, often vitriolic, letters-to-the-editor of various New York City publications. His lack of public acclaim led him to desperate measures: suspecting that the length of his name was responsible for his neglect, in about 1890 he began signing his paintings "Elshemus" (he reverted to the original spelling in 1913). On letterheads and in hyperbolic, self-published flyers he would proclaim his accomplishments: "Educator, Ex-actor, Amateur All-around Doctor, Mesmerist-Prophet and Mystic, Reader of Hands and Faces, Linguist of 5 languages", as well as world-class athlete and marksman, "Spirit-Painter Supreme", and musician whose improvisations rivaled the compositions of Chopin. All of this only reinforced the impression, already suggested by the peculiar imagery in many of his paintings, that he was either mad or a charlatan.

He was not without supporters, however. Eilshemius was championed by Marcel Duchamp, who discovered Eilshemius in 1917 and invited him to exhibit with him in Paris that year. Joseph Stella was an admirer and drew a particularly fine silverpoint portrait of him. His work was generally well received by French viewers and critics; his admirers included Matisse. Duchamp subsequently helped to arrange Eilshemius's first solo exhibition in 1920, at the Société Anonyme in New York City. The hostile critical reception to this exhibition, however, finally drove him to give up painting entirely in 1921, although there is a single known painting dated 1937. The remainder of his life was dedicated to self-promotion, and in 1931 he took to referring to himself as "Mahatma." Victor Ganz started collecting art in his teenage years with the purchases of watercolors by Louis Eilshemius and Jules Pascin and an oil painting by Raphael Soyer.

Injured in an automobile accident in 1932, he became increasingly reclusive. His health in decline and his family fortune spent, his mental stability deteriorated in his final year and he died in the psychopathic ward of Bellevue Hospital in 1941.

== Posthumous recognition ==
Since his death, Eilshemius's work has found a wider audience. One of the artist's few consistent patrons, Roy Neuberger, donated a large body of Eilshemius' work to the Neuberger Museum of Art located at SUNY Purchase College in New York State.

According to Stefan Banz, there is no evidence that Eilshemius was a grandson of Swiss painter Louis Léopold Robert as some sources report.

== Gallery ==
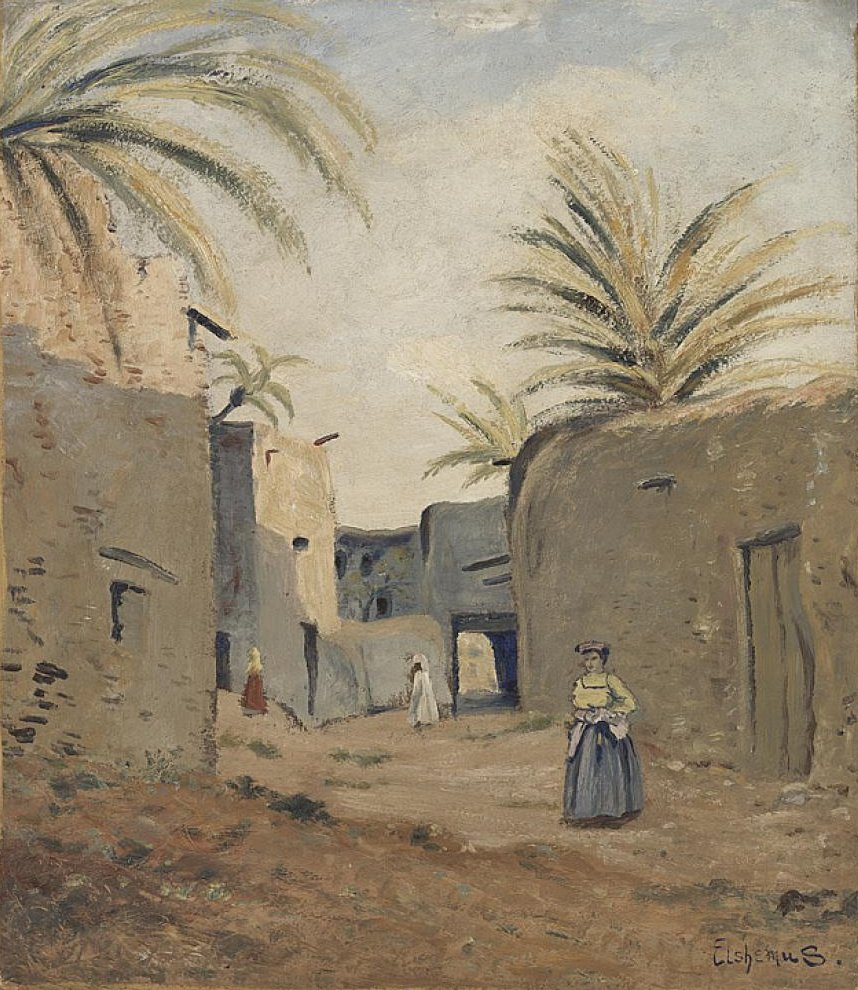
Street in Biskra (1893), Herbert F. Johnson Museum of Art

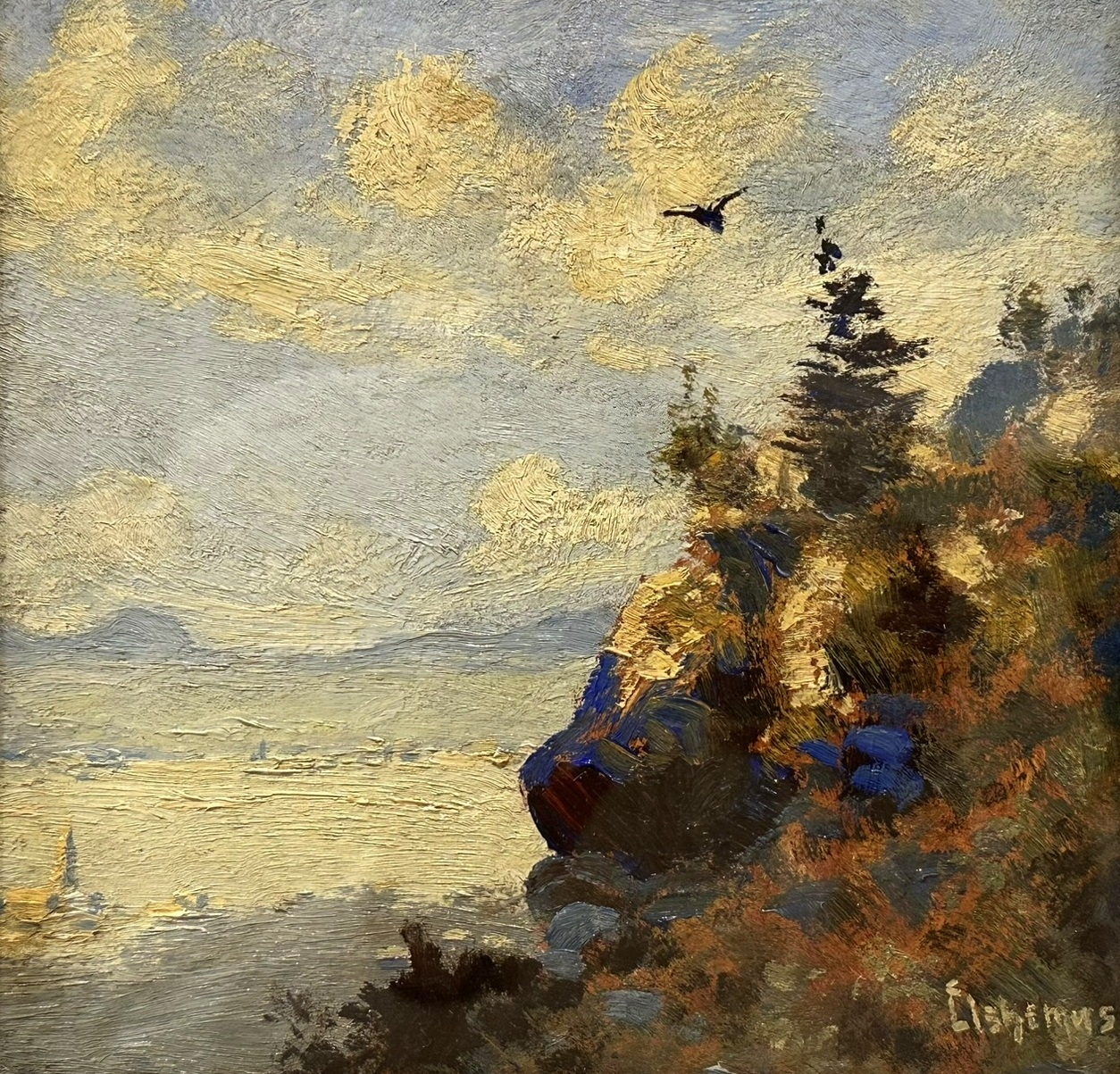
Summer Landscape with Hawk (1901–06), The Phillips Collection

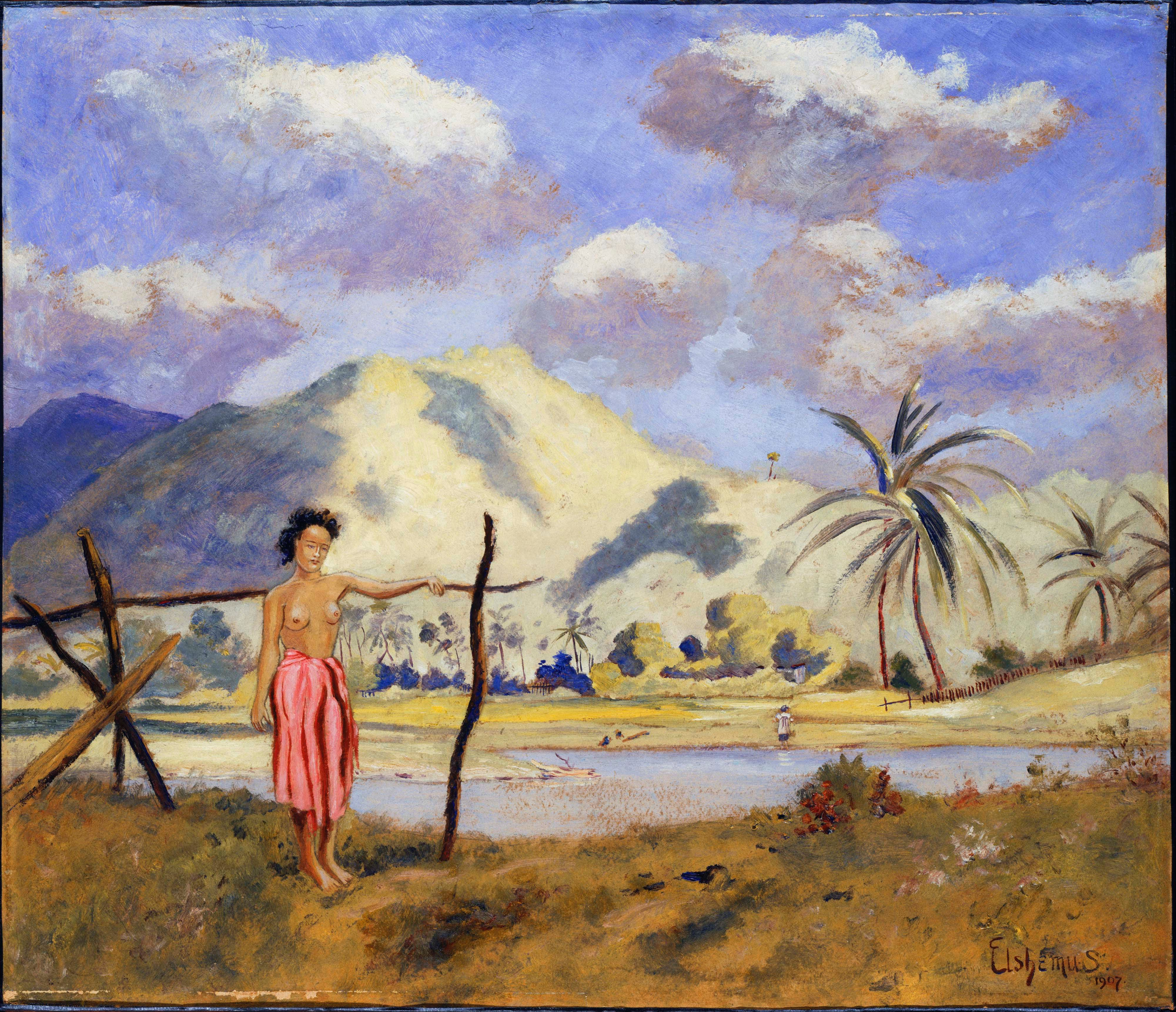
Samoa (1907), The Phillips Collection

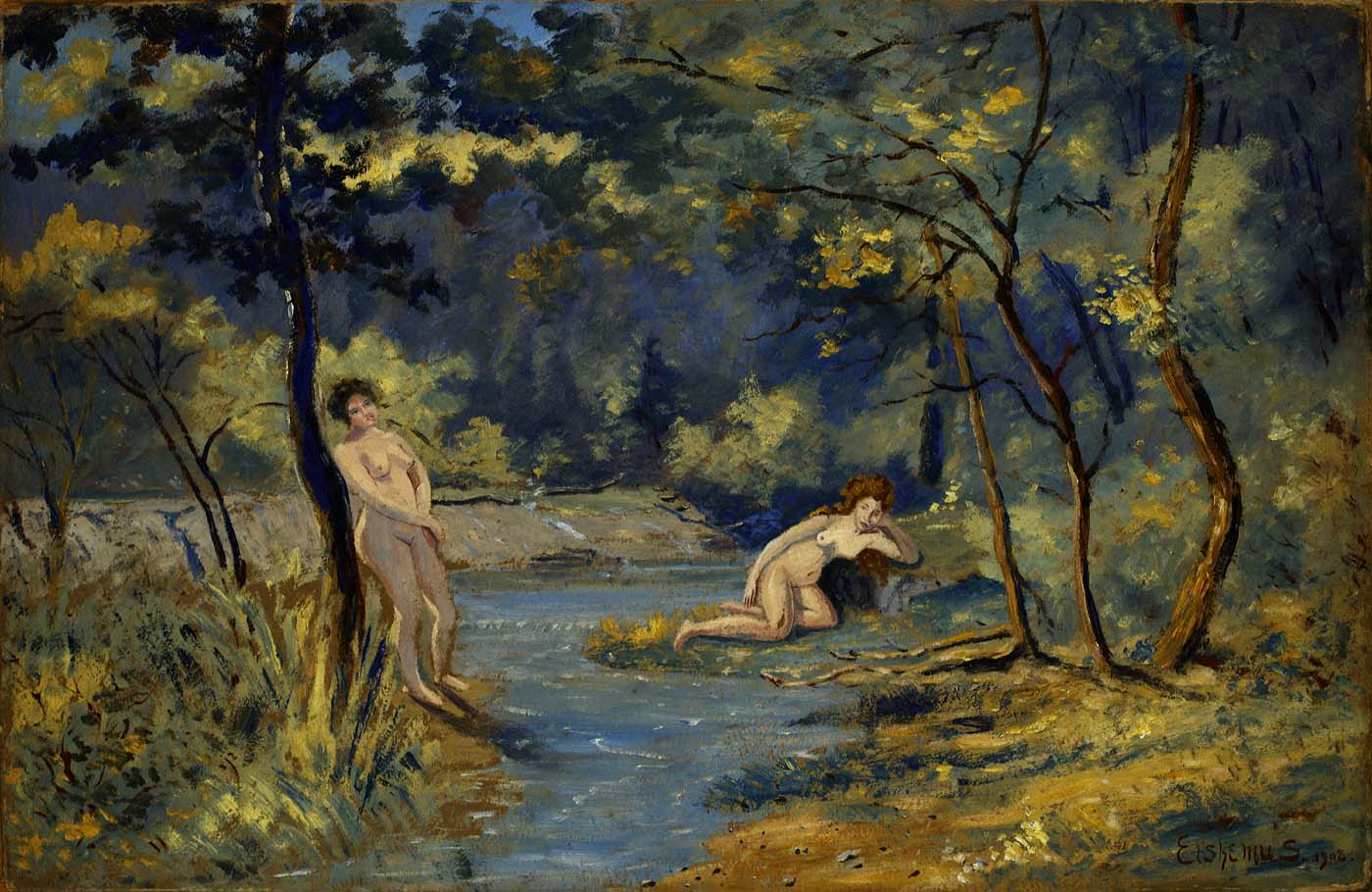
Standing and Reclining Nymphs (1908), Smithsonian American Art Museum

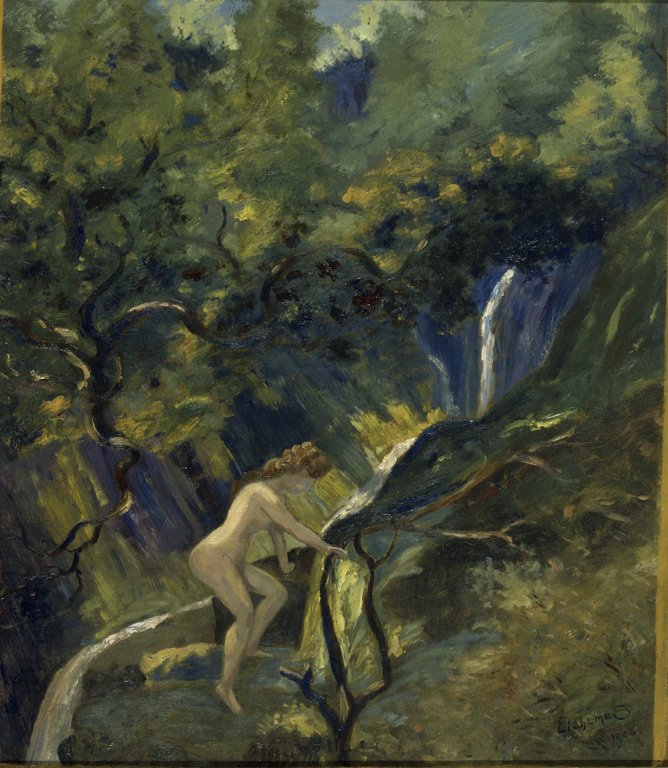
Nude Ascending (1908), Brooklyn Museum

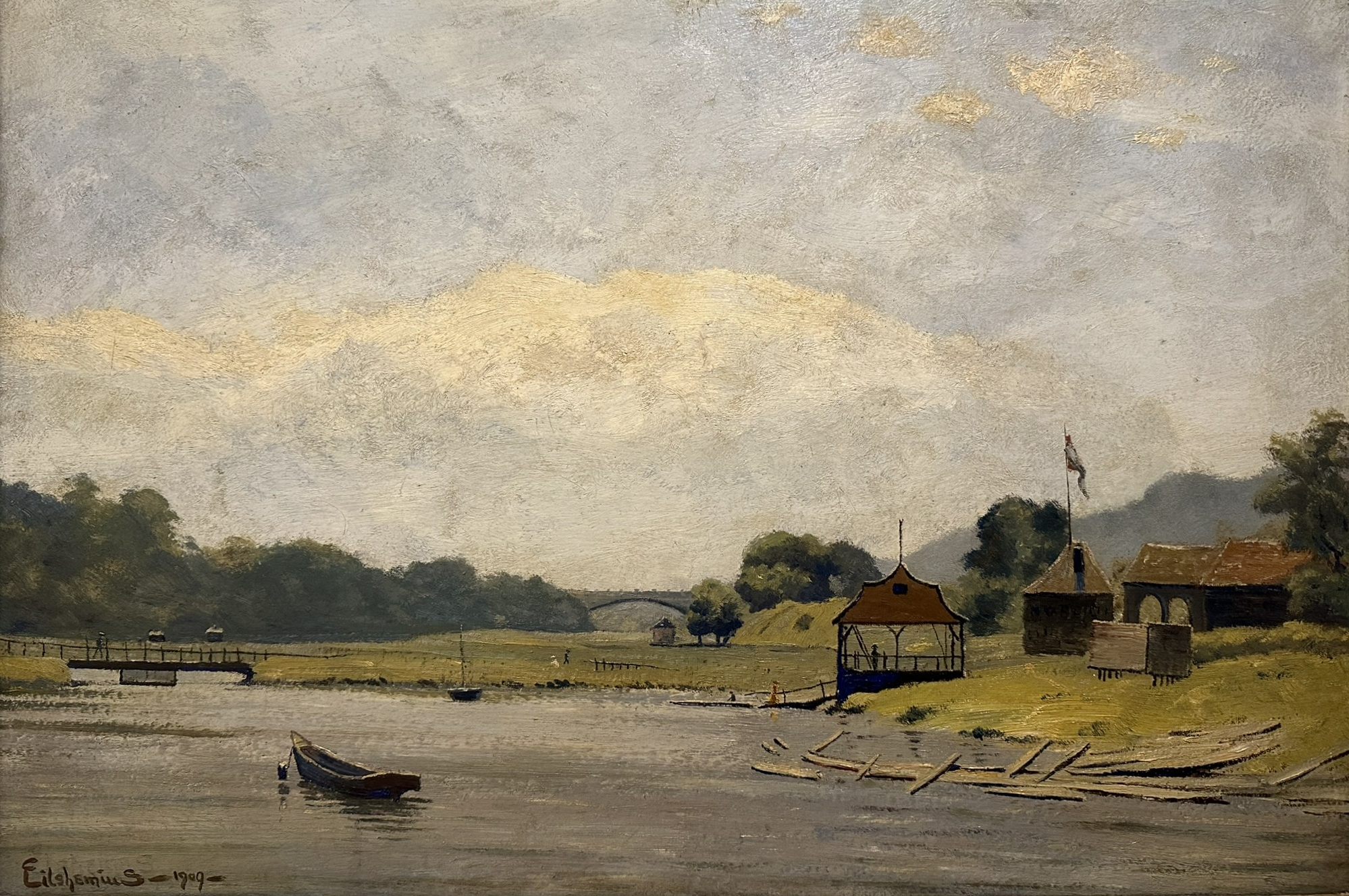
Kingsbridge (1909), The Phillips Collection

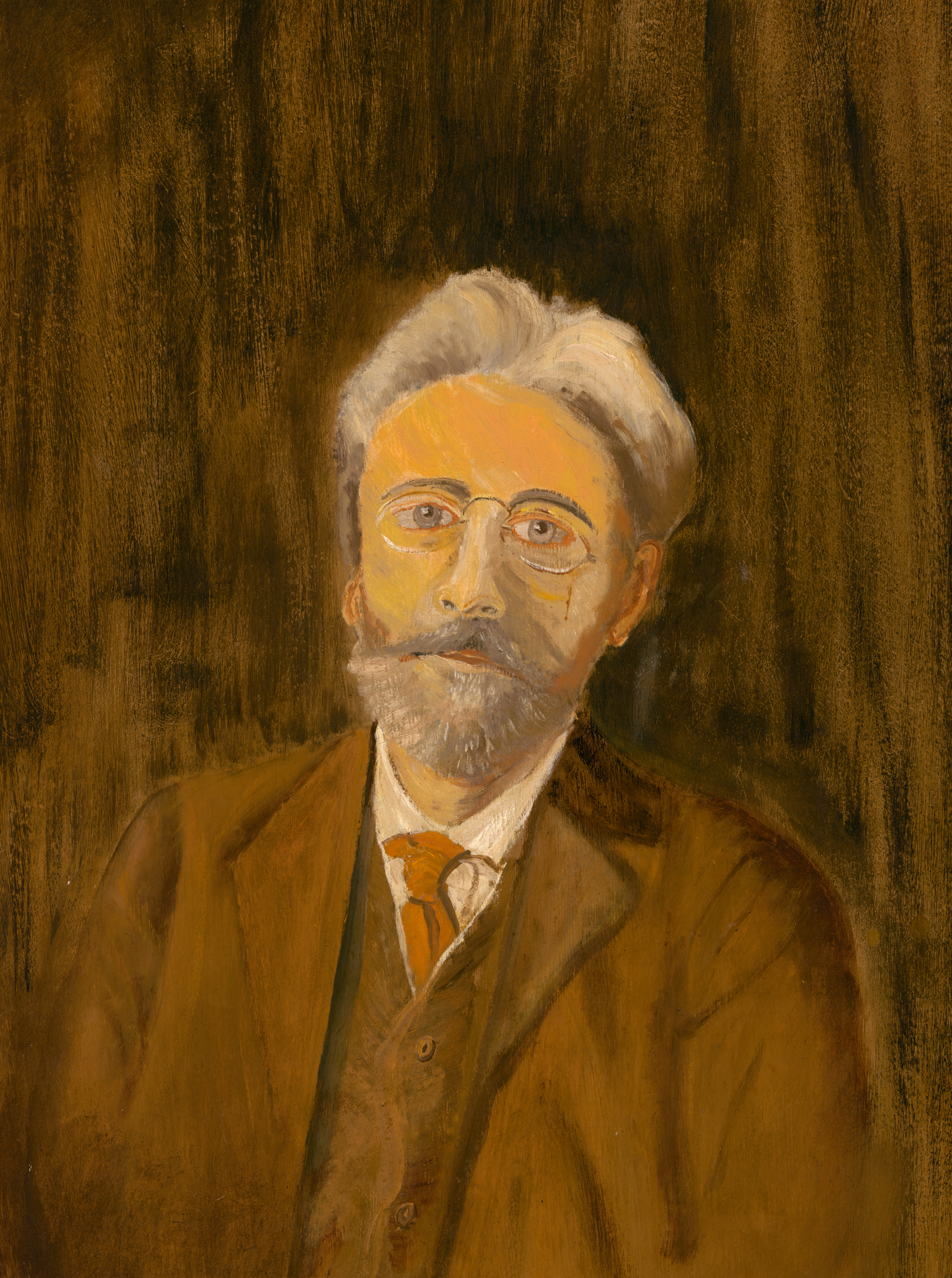
Self-portrait (1915), National Portrait Gallery

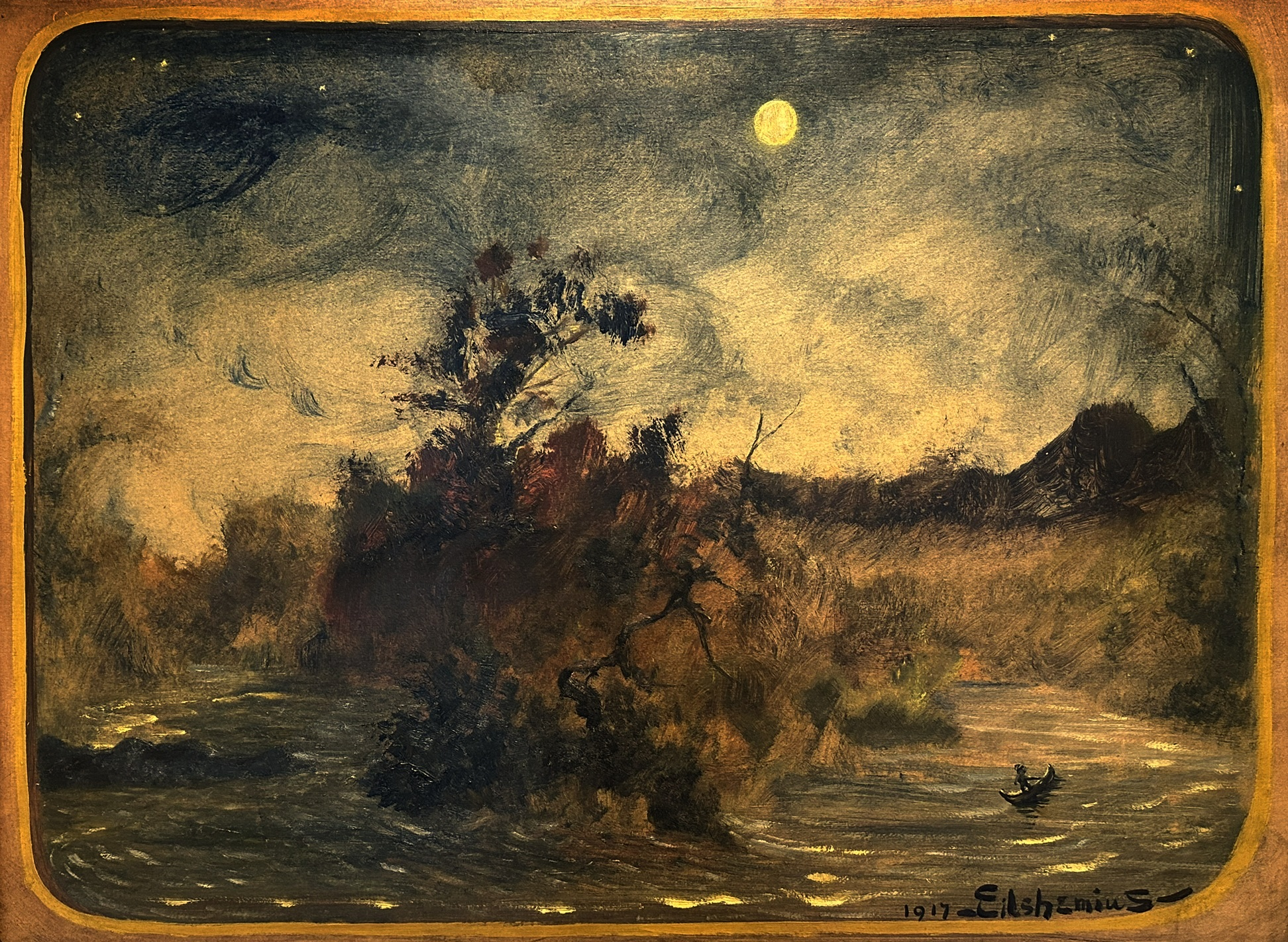
The Dream (1917), The Phillips Collection

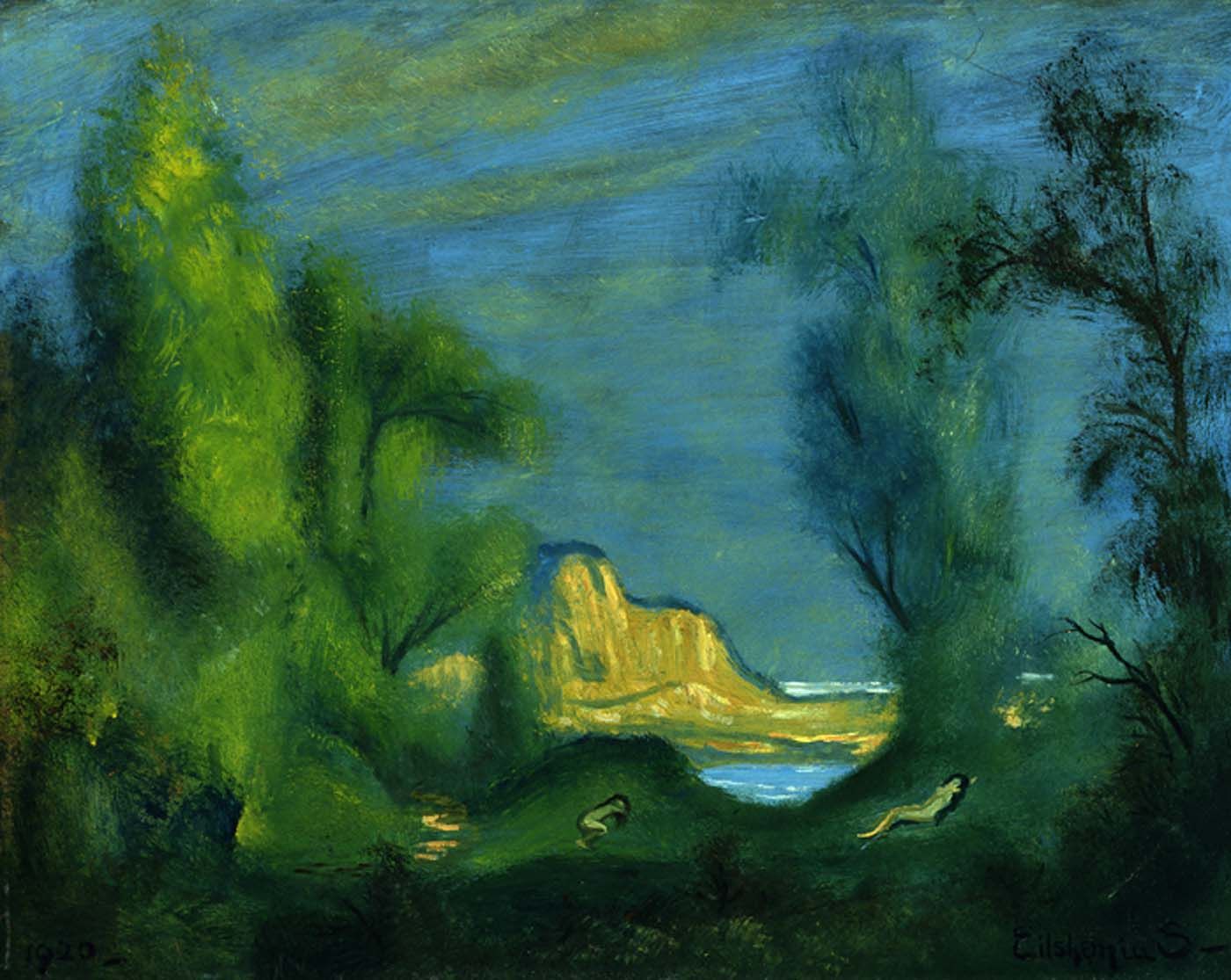
Nymphs Sleeping (1920), Smithsonian American Art Museum
