= Isaac Soyer =

Russian-born American social-realist painter and educator

- Born: Isaac Schoar; April 26, 1902; Borisoglebsk or Tambov (disputed), Russia
- Died: July 8, 1981 (aged 79); Manhattan, New York, United States
- Education: National Academy of Design, Cooper Union, Educational Alliance
- Known for: Painter
- Works: Employment Agency (1937)
- Movement: Social realist
- Family: Raphael Soyer (brother); Moses Soyer (brother)

Isaac Soyer (April 26, 1902 – July 8, 1981) was a Russian-born American social realist painter and educator. His art work often portrayed working-class people of New York City in his paintings.

== Early life and education ==
Soyer was born as Isaac Schoar on April 26, 1902, in Russia. He was the fourth of six children; his older twin brothers Moses Soyer and Raphael Soyer were also painters. Their father, Abraham Shauer, a Hebrew scholar, writer and teacher, raised his six children in an intellectual environment in which much emphasis was placed on academic and artistic pursuits. Their mother, Bella, was an embroiderer. Their cousin was painter and meteorologist Joshua Zalman Holland. Due to the many difficulties for the Jewish population in the late Russian Empire, the Soyer family was forced to emigrate in 1912 to the United States, where they ultimately settled in the Bronx. The family name changed from Schoar to Soyer during immigration.

Isaac Soyer studied at the National Academy of Design, Cooper Union, Educational Alliance and studied in Paris and Madrid.

== Career ==
Soyer painted portraits of friends and relatives and vignettes of working-class life. He taught classes at the Works Progress Administration's Federal Art Project.

Soyer's work Employment Agency (1937) reveals the social realities of the years of the Great Depression. It features the image of a Black woman and three white men waiting for a job interview response.

During World War II, Soyer worked at Bell Aircraft Corporation in Buffalo, New York.

Soyer was an art educator at a number of institutions. From 1941 until 1947 he taught at Albright Art School at the University of Buffalo; and from 1947 until 1971 at Brooklyn Museum Art School. He additionally taught at Art Institute of Buffalo, Niagara Falls Art School, Educational Alliance, New School for Social Research (1968), Art Students League of New York (1969).

== Death and legacy ==
Soyer died of a heart attack at Lenox Hill Hospital on July 8, 1981, at age 79; he was residing in Manhattan at the time.

Several of his works are in the collections of public museums, such as the Whitney Museum of American Art, the Brooklyn Museum, the Albright-Knox Art Gallery, Buffalo, New York, and the Dallas Museum of Art.
