= Renee and Chaim Gross Foundation =

Coordinates: 40°43′43″N 73°59′56″W

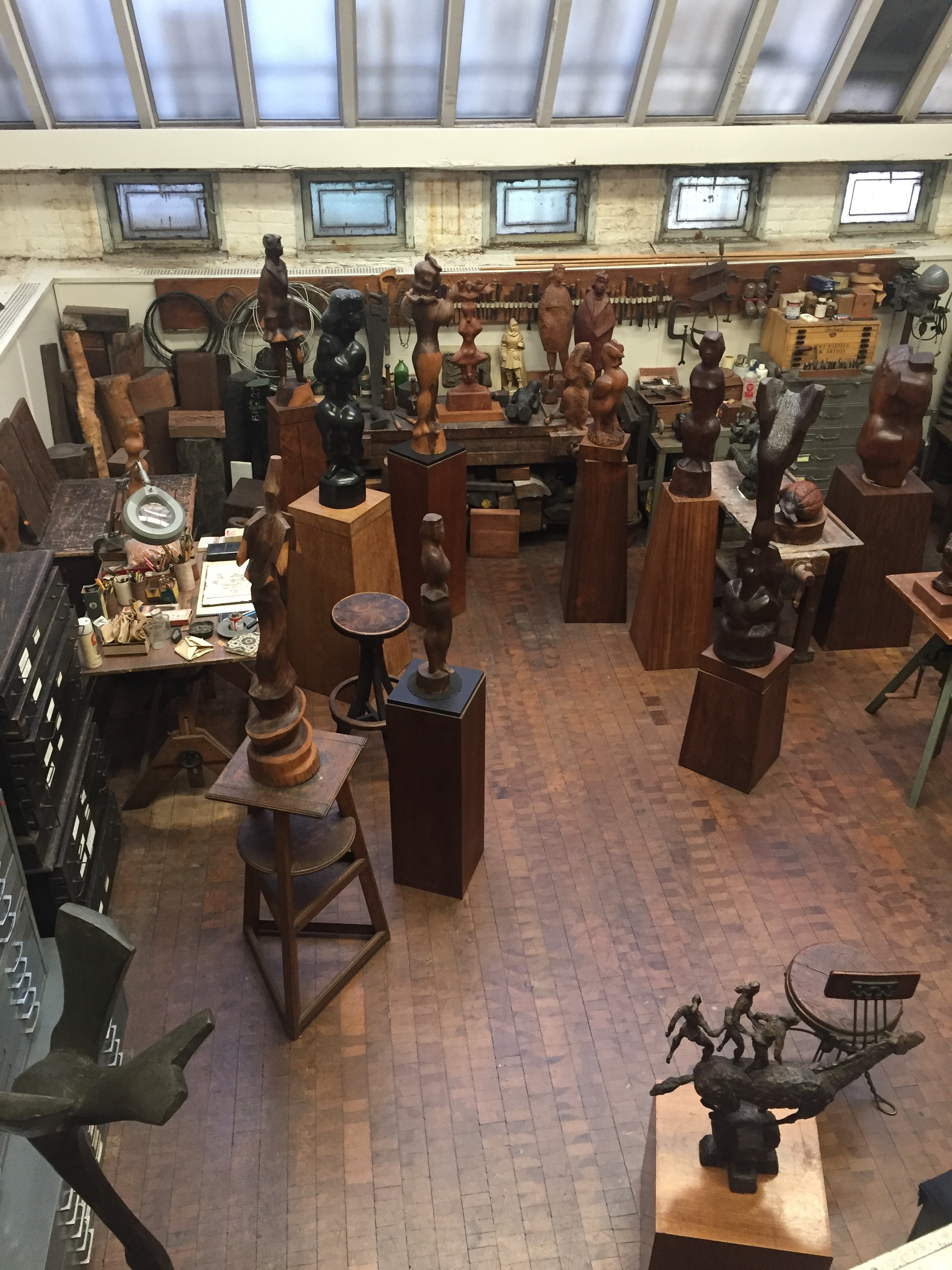
Studio space at The Renee & Chaim Gross Foundation

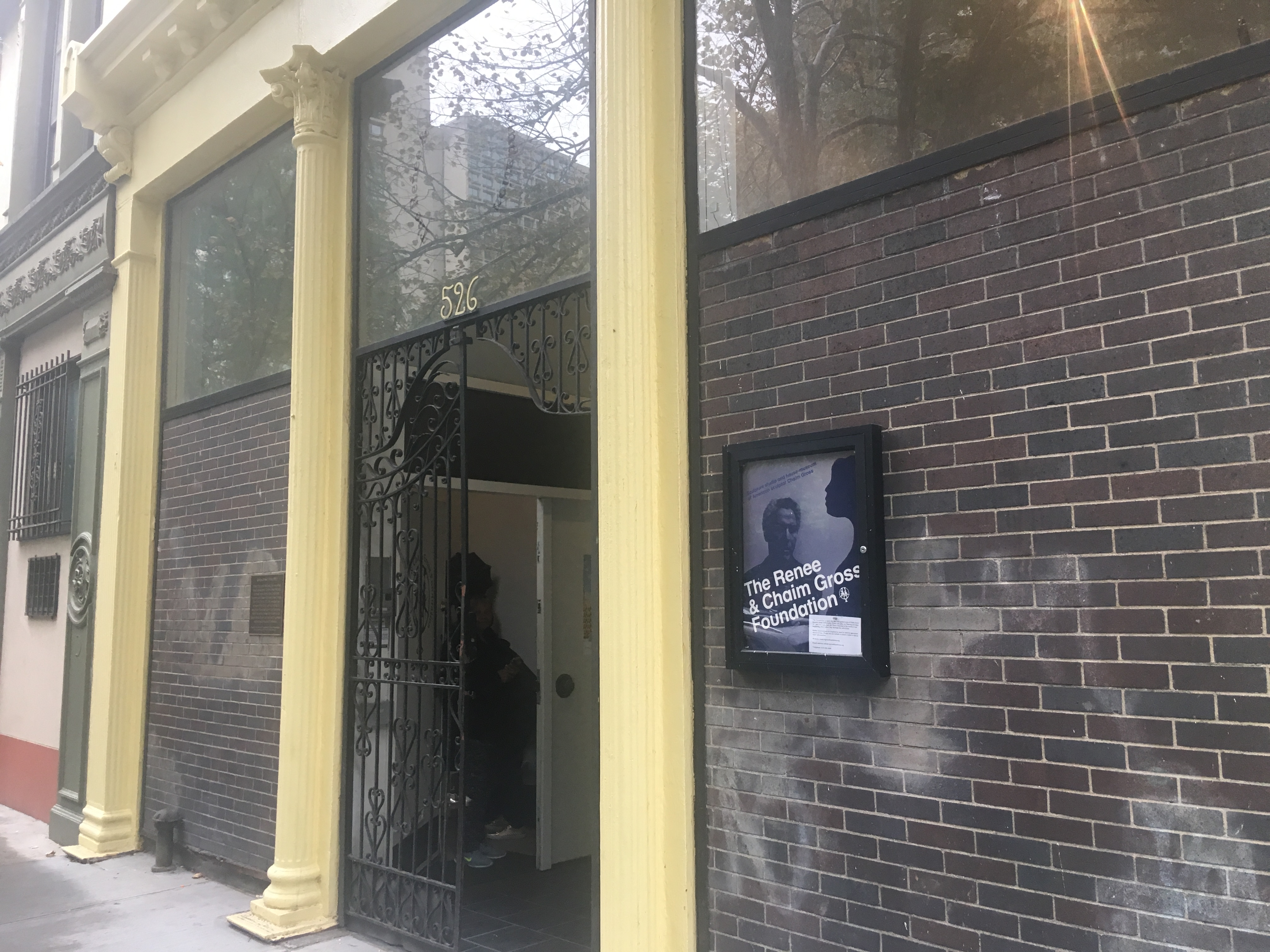
Renee and Chaim Gross Foundation house in Greenwich Village

The Renee and Chaim Gross Foundation is a non-profit organization incorporated in 1989 dedicated to the study of modern American sculptor Chaim Gross (1902–91), his contemporaries, and the history of 20th-century American art. It is located in the sculptor's four-story historic home on LaGuardia Place in Manhattan's Greenwich Village neighborhood and is open to the public. In addition to the artist's sculpture and drawings, it also exhibits important works of American, European, Pre-Columbian and African art that the artist collected. In 2015, the Foundation won a Village Award from the Greenwich Village Society for Historic Preservation for its contributions as a resource to the downtown community.

The townhouse was built in the 1830s and was converted to an industrial loft in the 1880s. The Gross family converted it into a residential space when they purchased the building in 1963. The first floor is the artist's sculpture studio, featuring a dramatic skylight and an array of tools and materials related to the process of direct carving, which Gross pioneered in America in the late 1920s. Adjacent to the studio is a permanent installation of Gross' sculpture from the 1920s through the 1980s. The second floor features changing exhibits exploring themes in modern American art; past exhibits have examined the photography of sculpture, American surrealism, and direct carving. The Foundation also hosts related programs including artist's talks and poetry readings, as well as joint programs with the SoHo Arts Network, a consortium of downtown arts non-profits founded in 2015. The third floor is the family's living and dining space which remains as it was during the artist's lifetime, featuring a Salon-style installation by Gross of his wide-ranging collection.

All three floors are open to the public during regular gallery hours or by appointment. The building and collections are actively used by students and artists studying at the New York Studio School, New York University, CUNY Staten Island, and a number of other schools.
