= Victor Ganz =

American business owner and art collector

Victor Wendell Ganz
- Born: 7 April 1913; New York City, US
- Died: October 26, 1987 (aged 74); New York City, US
- Occupation: Businessperson
- Known for: Art collection
- Spouse: Sally Wile
- Children: 4

Victor Wendell Ganz (1913–1987) was an American business owner and art collector. He was the president of D. Lisner & Company, a small costume jewelry manufacturer. With limited resources he and his wife Sally Wile-Ganz built one of the most important collections of contemporary art in the 20th century. They became known for their ability to choose art, as "collectors who never made a mistake". Their collection was sold after their deaths in record-setting auctions.

== Biography ==
Victor Wendell Ganz was born in New York on April 7, 1913. The son of Saul Ganz and his wife, the former Ruth Wendell, he attended public schools and the City College of New York before going to work at D. Lisner Company, a costume jewelry business, that had been founded by his uncle in 1875. Lisner costume jewelry was sold all over the United States, but maintained a small sales force of about ten reps throughout the country. As president of Lisner, Ganz was a creative spirit and became involved in every aspect of jewelry production. He traveled weekly between New York and Providence to oversee manufacturing. After his in-house designer, Sidney Welicky, retired, Ganz himself and Iraida Garey, vice president of product development, took over the designing responsibilities. Ganz' style could be seen in everything from the actual jewelry to the retail packaging and advertising.

Ganz started collecting art in his teenage years with the purchases of watercolors by Louis Eilshemius and Jules Pascin and an oil painting by Raphael Soyer. With these purchases, his fascination with contemporary masters was born.

Ganz had almost no training and was largely self-taught. In the 1930s he had a strict regimen in order to learn more about art. Every Saturday he traveled as far as possible, visiting exhibitions and art shows in and around New York. Although he made contacts with artists, dealers and curators, most of his knowledge came from the study of the works themselves.

In 1941, there began what Ganz sometimes described as "a love affair with Picasso". He bought his first Picasso in 1941, Le Rêve, for $7,000. (Steve Wynn, seller of the painting, had arranged to sell it to Steven A. Cohen for $140 million, which would have made it the highest price ever paid for a painting, but he infamously poked a 6 inch hole in the picture with his elbow while showing it to some prominent guests in 2007.) In 1942 Ganz married Sally Wile and together they started a collection. Thereafter the Ganzes bought heavily and very well in all periods of Picasso. In 1956 they acquired the entire series of Picasso's variations of Eugène Delacroix's The Women of Algiers. The series was composed of 15 works and acquired at a cost of $212,953. Victor later sold all but five to dealers and museums for about $138,000.

Knowing that Picasso by then had acquired the status of an Old Master, the Ganzes began shortly afterward to collect Jasper Johns, Robert Rauschenberg and later Frank Stella. When these artists, in their turn, had assumed magisterial status, the couple once again turned to young and less familiar artists, especially to Eva Hesse, Dorothea Rockburne and Mel Bochner. In every case the Ganzes worked as equal partners and showed a degree of discrimination that was much admired by museum professionals.

During the rest of his life Ganz and his wife gathered several masterpieces for very low prices. The Ganzes accumulated works by Jasper Johns, Eva Hesse, Robert Rauschenberg, Frank Stella, Mel Bochner and other artists whom the couple championed and befriended. Their understanding of emerging leaders of the art world earned Victor appointments in leading museums and associations. On his retirement, he gave all his time and energy to public service for art. A trustee of the Whitney Museum beginning in 1981 and its vice president when he died, Ganz was the only active trustee to have served on all its acquisition committees. He was also chairman of the Battery Park City Fine Arts Committee from its inception in 1982 to his death. In 1985 Ganz served on the museum's advisory panel of the National Endowment for the Arts.

Victor died of lung cancer at his home in New York on October 26, 1987, at age 74. Sally died January 27, 1997, also at home, aged 85.

== Dispersal of the collection ==
Sally Ganz consigned 12 paintings to Sotheby's, where they sold for $48.4 million on November 10, 1988, the third-highest gross for a collection of modern and contemporary art sold at auction. Inheritance taxes forced the Ganzes' children to dispose of the most valuable part of the collection in 1997. In November 1997, works from the collection were sold in four separate auctions at Christie's, New York. At the time, Christie's estimated the sales to fetch more than $125 million.

The most important works were sold on November 10, 1997 in a single owner sale of 58 works of which 57 sold. Christie's had put the Ganz collection up for viewing for a month preceding the auction at its Park Avenue galleries and at its annex at 308 East 59th Street. More than 25,000 people visited Christie's to view the works and more than 2,000 people attended the auction.

For 73 of the 114 works sold in 1997, initial purchase prices are known. In 1997 dollars, these works had cost $4.9 million and fetched $206.5 million (including buyer's premium) in November, 1997. The Ganzes are estimated to have netted revenue of $183.8 million. The annualized growth in value (after inflation) was 12.06%, or 11.74% after seller's commissions. At the time of the auction, it was the largest private owner art sale in history.
