= Raphael Soyer =

American painter

- Born: Raphael Schoar; December 25, 1899; Borisoglebsk, Tambov Governorate (now in Voronezh Oblast)
- Died: November 4, 1987 (aged 87); New York City, US
- Education: Cooper Union, National Academy of Design, Art Students League of New York
- Known for: Painting, drawing, printmaking
- Movement: Social Realism
- Spouse: Rebecca Letz
- Children: 1
- Family: Moses Soyer (brother); Isaac Soyer (brother)

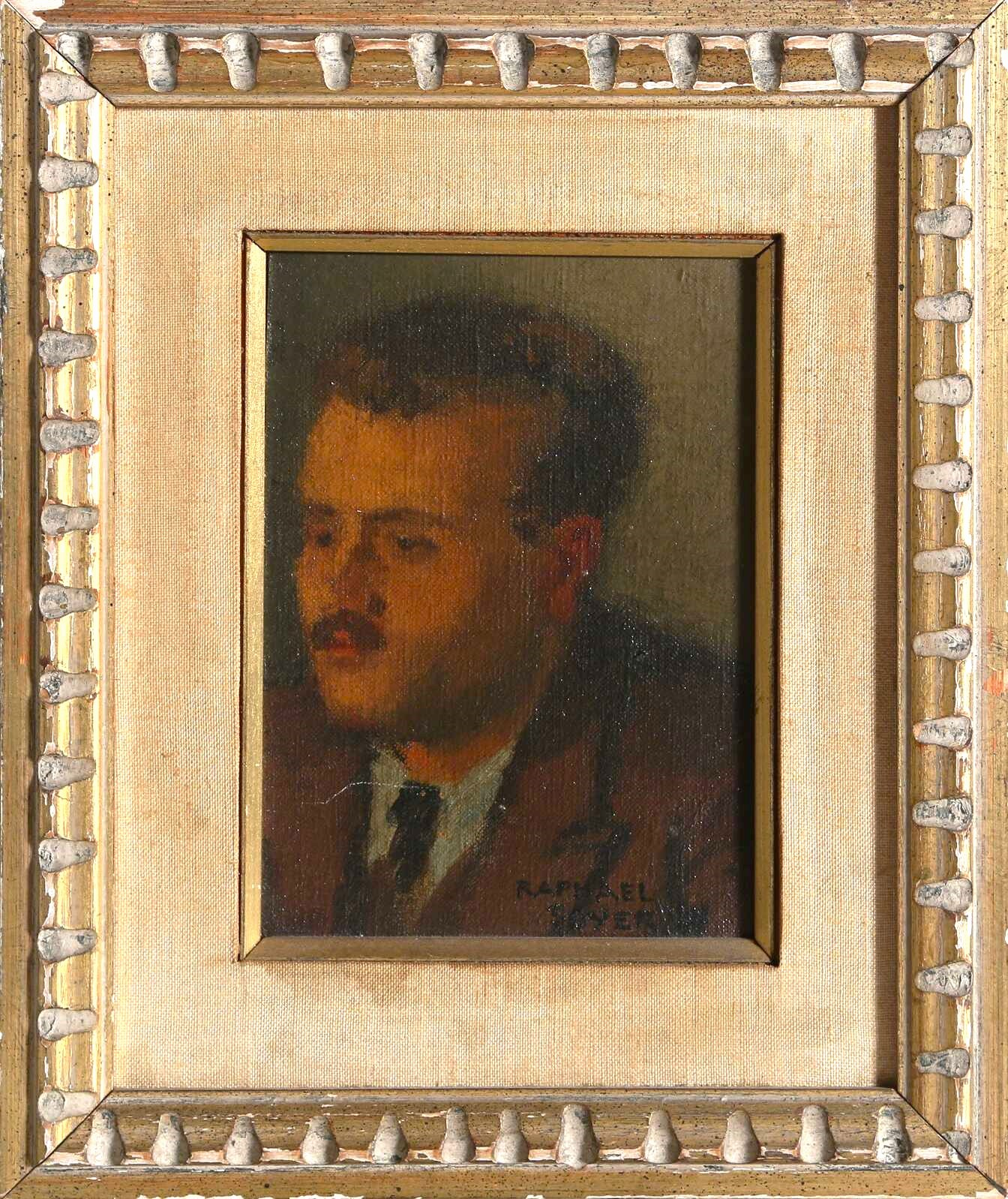
Raphael Soyer, Portrait of a Man, ca. 1930

Raphael Zalman Soyer (December 25, 1899 – November 4, 1987) was a Russian-born American painter, draftsman, and printmaker. Soyer was referred to as an American scene painter. He is identified as a Social Realist because of his interest in men and women viewed in contemporary settings which included the streets, subways, salons and artists' studios of New York City. He also wrote several books on his life and art.

His brothers Moses Soyer and Isaac Soyer were also painters.

Soyer was a member of the Writers and Artists for Peace in the Middle East, a pro-Israel group. In 1984, he signed a letter protesting German arms sales to Saudi Arabia.

== Early life and education ==
He was born as Raphael Schoar. He and his identical twin brother, Moses, were born in Borisoglebsk, Tambov, a southern province of Russia, on December 25, 1899. Their father, Abraham Shauer, a Hebrew scholar, writer and teacher, raised his six children in an intellectual environment in which much emphasis was placed on academic and artistic pursuits. Their mother, Bella, was an embroiderer. Their cousin was painter and meteorologist, Joshua Zalman Holland. Due to the many difficulties for the Jewish population in the late Russian Empire, the Soyer family was forced to emigrate in 1912 to the United States, where they ultimately settled in the Bronx. The family name changed from Schoar to Soyer during immigration.

Raphael pursued his art education at the free schools of the Cooper Union between 1914 and 1917, studying alongside his twin Moses. It was at Cooper Union where he met Chaim Gross, who became a lifelong friend from that time.

He continued his studies at the National Academy of Design from 1918 until 1922 and, subsequently, at the Art Students League of New York intermittently between 1920 until 1926. While at ASL, he studied with Guy Pene du Bois and Boardman Robinson, taking up the gritty urban subjects of the Ashcan School.

== Career ==
After his formal education ended, Soyer became associated with the Fourteenth Street School of painters that included Reginald Marsh, Isabel Bishop, Kenneth Hayes Miller, Peggy Bacon and, his teacher, Guy Pene du Bois. Soyer persistently investigated a number of themes—female nudes, portraits of friends and family, New York and, especially, its people—in his paintings, drawings, watercolors and prints. He also painted a vast number of self-portraits throughout his career. Soyer was adamant in his belief in representational art and strongly opposed the dominant force of abstract art during the late 1940s and early 1950s.

After his time in art school, Soyer did not immediately begin working as a professional artist, and instead painted during his free time while working other jobs. Soyer's first solo exhibition took place in 1929. Beginning in the early 1930s, he showed regularly in the large annual and biennial American exhibitions of the Whitney Museum of American Art, the Carnegie Institute, the Art Institute of Chicago, the Corcoran Gallery of Art, the National Academy of Design, and the Pennsylvania Academy of the Fine Arts. He was also a member of the Society of American Graphic Artists.

Soyer's teaching career began at the John Reed Club, New York, in 1930 and included stints at the Art Students League, the New School for Social Research and the National Academy.

He was an artist of the Great Depression, and during the 1930s, Raphael and his brother Moses engaged in Social Realism, demonstrating empathy with the struggles of the working class. In 1939, the twins worked together with the Works Project Administration, Federal Art Project (WPA-FAP) mural at the Kingsessing Station post office in Philadelphia.

Soyer deeply admired fellow American artist Thomas Eakins, and produced a group portrait entitled Homage to Thomas Eakins, which was based on Fantin-Latour's Hommage à Delacroix.

Among Soyer's portrait subjects were artists and writers who were his friends; these included Allen Ginsberg, Arshile Gorky, Chaim Gross, Gitel Steed, Edward Hopper, Philip Evergood, Alice Neel and Steve Poleskie. In 1967 the Whitney Museum of American Art exhibited a retrospective of his work.

Soyer was hired in 1940, along with eight other prominent American artists, to document dramatic scenes and characters during the production of the film The Long Voyage Home, a cinematic adaptation of Eugene O'Neill's plays. He also illustrated two books for Isaac Bashevis Singer, entitled A Little Boy in Search of God and Love and Exile.

== Awards and honors ==
- 1981 – Founder's Medal, by James Smithson Society
- 1981 – Gold Medal, American Academy of Arts and Letters

== Death and legacy ==
Soyer died from cancer at the age of 87 in his home in New York City on November 4, 1987. He is buried at Acacia Cemetery in Queens, New York.

His work is included in many public museum collections including the Butler Institute of American Art, the National Gallery of Art, Smithsonian American Art Museum, Metropolitan Museum of Art, Whitney Museum of American Art, Hirshhorn Museum, among others.

Art collector Victor Ganz started collecting art in his teenage years with the purchases of watercolors by Louis Eilshemius and Jules Pascin, and an oil painting by Raphael Soyer.

== Personal life ==
On February 8, 1931, Soyer married Rebecca Letz, who was friends with his sister Fanny. Together they had one daughter.

He was a close friend of Arshile Gorky and his wife Agnes, whom he painted while pregnant (fully clothed).

== Publications ==
In 1953, Soyer co-founded the magazine Reality: A Journal of Artists' Opinions, published by figurative artists as a response to the prevailing influence of non-objective art.

=== By Soyer ===
Soyer wrote and illustrated the following books:

- Soyer, Raphael (1962). A Painter's Pilgrimage: An Account of a Journey with Drawings by the Author, Crown. Crown Publisher. OCLC 3264065.
- Soyer, Raphael (1966). Homage to Thomas Eakins, etc. Thomas Yoseloff. OCLC 996127.
- Soyer, Raphael (1969). Self-Revealment: a Memoir. Maecenas Press; Random House. ISBN 978-1125969311. OCLC 15241335.
- Soyer, Raphael (1977). Diary of an Artist. New Republic Books. ISBN 978-0915220298.

=== About Soyer ===
- Kramer, Hilton (October 21, 1977). "Art: Summing Up Raphael Soyer". The New York Times. p. 74.
