= Moses Soyer =

American painter

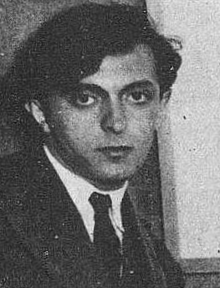
- Soyer c. 1926
- Born: Moses Schoar; December 25, 1899; Borisoglebsk, Tambov Governorate, Russian Empire
- Died: September 2, 1974 (aged 74); New York City, U.S.
- Education: Cooper Union, National Academy of Design, Educational Alliance, Ferrer Center and Colony
- Known for: Painting
- Movement: Social Realism
- Spouse: Ida Chassner Soyer
- Children: 1
- Family: Raphael Soyer (twin brother); Isaac Soyer (brother)

Moses Soyer (December 25, 1899 – September 2, 1974) was an American social realist painter.

== Biography ==
Untitled painting by Moses Soyer, Honolulu Museum of Art

Soyer was born Moses Schoar and both he and his identical twin brother, Raphael, were born in Borisoglebsk, Tambov Governorate, a southern province of the Russian Empire on December 25, 1899. Their father, Abraham Shauer, a Hebrew scholar, writer and teacher, raised his six children in an intellectual environment in which much emphasis was placed on academic and artistic pursuits. Their mother, Bella, was an embroiderer. Their cousin was painter and meteorologist Joshua Zalman Holland. The difficulties faced by the Jewish population in the late Russian Empire forced the Soyer family to emigrate in 1912 to the United States, where they ultimately settled in the Bronx. The family name changed from Schoar to Soyer during immigration.

Soyer married in 1922 to Ida Chassner, a dancer. Together they had one son, David Soyer. Dancers were a recurring subject in Soyer's paintings.

Soyer studied art in New York with his twin Raphael, first at Cooper Union, and continued his studied at National Academy of Design. He diverged from his twin and attended Educational Alliance. He later studied at the Ferrer Art School under the Ashcan painters Robert Henri and George Bellows.

He had his first solo exhibition in 1926 and began teaching art the following year at the Contemporary Art School and The New School.

During the Great Depression of the 1930s, Moses and his brother Raphael engaged in Social Realism, demonstrating empathy with the struggles of the working class. In 1939, the twins worked together with the Works Project Administration, Federal Art Project (WPA-FAP) mural at the Kingsessing Station post office in Philadelphia.

Soyer wrote a weekly column for a Yiddish newspaper called "In the World of Art".

== Death and legacy ==
Soyer died in the Chelsea Hotel in New York on September 2, 1974, while painting dancer and choreographer Phoebe Neville. He was buried in Acacia Cemetery in Queens County, New York.

The Brooklyn Museum, the Detroit Institute of Arts, the Hirshhorn Museum and Sculpture Garden (Washington, DC), the Honolulu Museum of Art, the Metropolitan Museum of Art, the Museum of Modern Art (New York City), the Philadelphia Museum of Art, The Phillips Collection (Washington, DC), the Walker Art Center (Minneapolis, Minnesota), the Whitney Museum of American Art (New York City), the Amon Carter Museum of American Art (Fort Worth), the Smithsonian American Art Museum, and Yale University Art Gallery are among the institutions holding works by Moses Soyer. The untitled painting in the collection of the Honolulu Museum of Art is an example of his intimate and psychologically penetrating portraits of ordinary people, for which he is best known.
