= Stefan Hirsch =

American painter

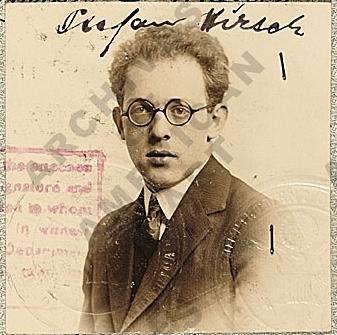
- Born: January 2, 1899; Nuremberg, Germany
- Died: September 28, 1964 (aged 65)

Stefan Hirsch (January 2, 1899 – September 28, 1964) was an American artist. Many of his paintings have the hard edges, smooth surfaces, and simplified forms of the precisionists, and their typical subjects—cityscapes and industrial scenes—are sometimes also his, but in general, his works have an emotional element and, as one critic has said, "take on an otherworldly tone" that sets them apart. In addition to work showing a personal version of precisionism, he produced paintings, drawings, and prints in the social realist, Mexican muralist, and surrealist styles as well as still lifes, portraits, and landscapes that defy easy classification. His work achieved critical recognition from 1919 onward, has been widely collected, and is today found in many American museums including the Phillips Collection, the Whitney Museum of American Art, the Metropolitan Museum of Art, and the Corcoran Gallery.

== Early life and education ==
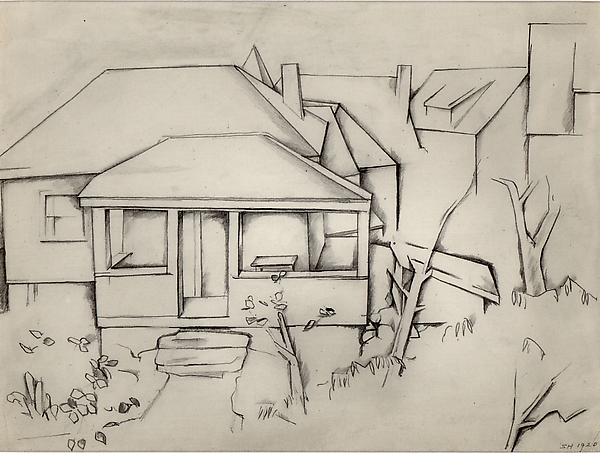
House by Stefan Hirsch, 1920, Graphite on paper, 7 5/8 x 9 7/8 inches

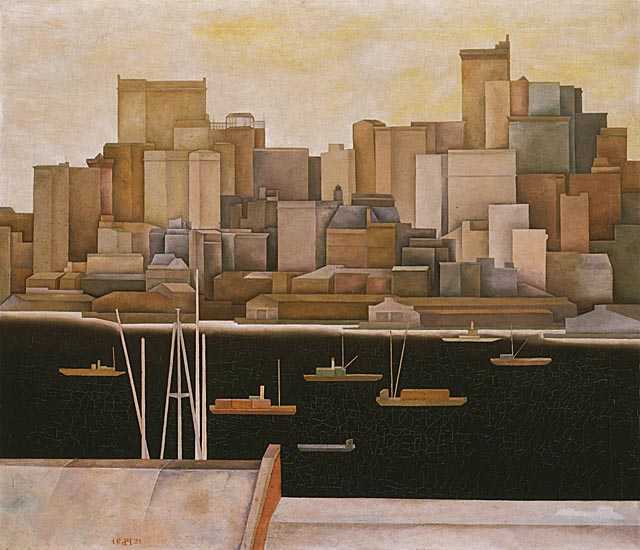
New York, Lower Manhattan by Stefan Hirsch, 1920 or 1921, oil on canvas, 74 x 86 inches

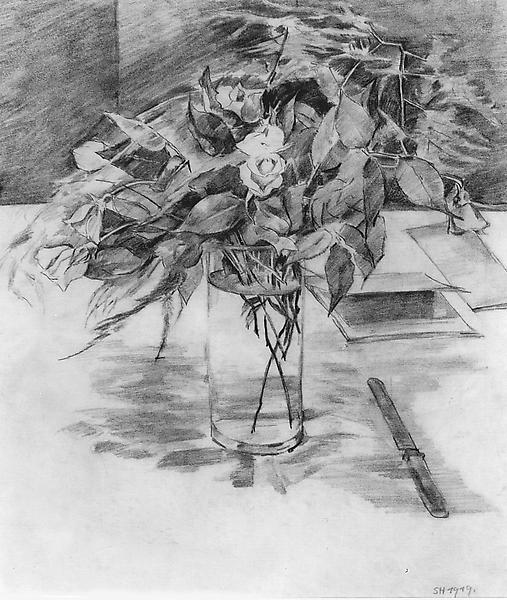
Roses in a Vase by Stefan Hirsch, 1919, graphite on paper, 12 1/4 x 10 inches

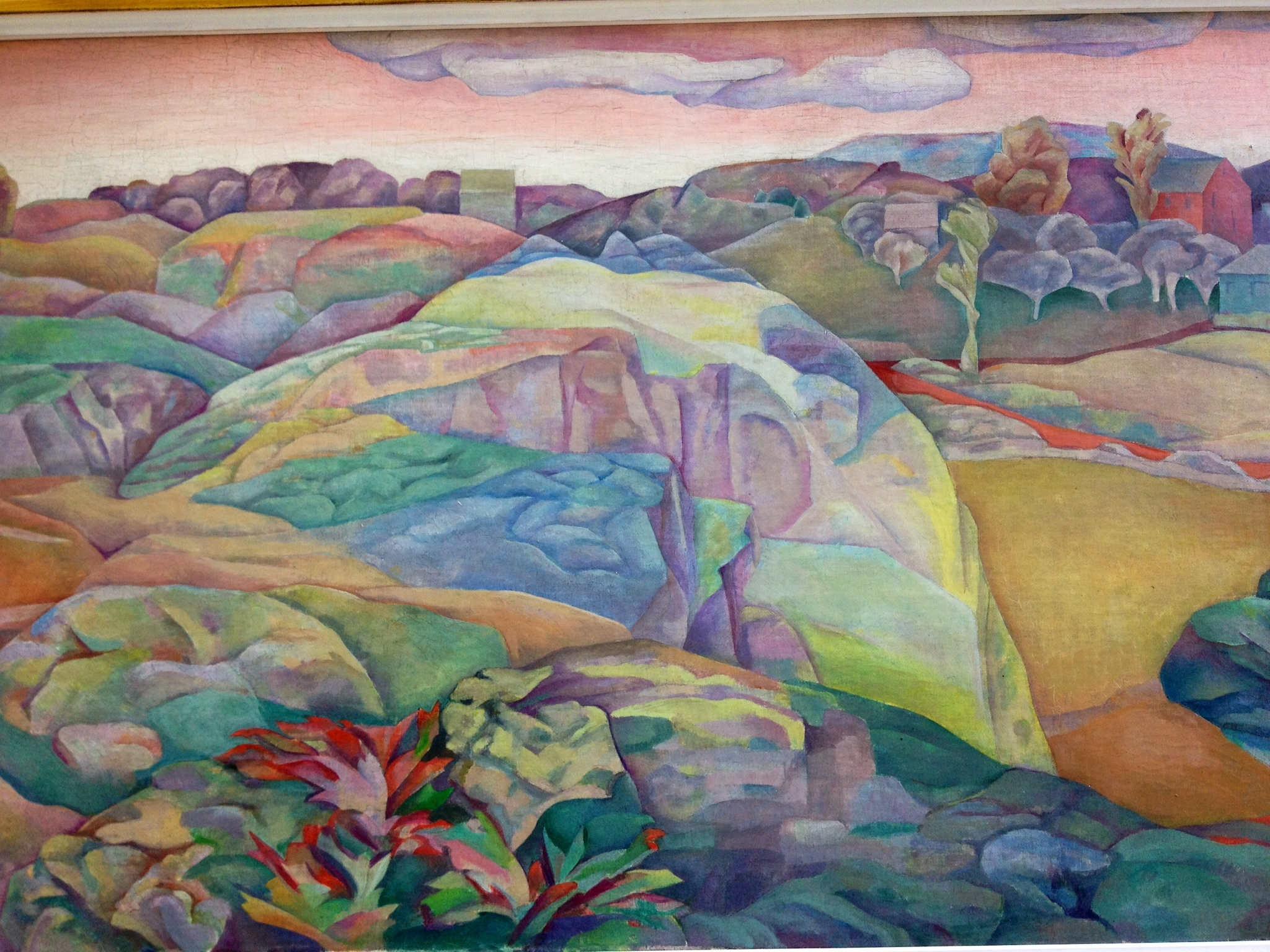
Pastoral Scene, New England by Stefan Hirsch, oil on canvas, 1926, 19 x 32 inches

Hirsch was born in Nuremberg, Germany, to parents who were American citizens of German heritage. He studied law and art at the University of Zürich and was there exposed to artists associated with the Dada movement. When he was 20 his family emigrated to New York and there he was befriended by the teacher and art patron, Hamilton Easter Field. Along with the painter, Yasuo Kuniyoshi and sculptor, Robert Laurent, he spent several summer sessions at Field's school in the Perkins Cove section of Ogunquit, Maine. His first appearance in an exhibition was in 1919 at the Society of Independent Artists in New York.

== Mature style: 1920s ==
At the time of his first one-man show in 1927, a critic for the New York Sun was surprised Hirsch had not been given one before. His work stood out when it was exhibited and was collected widely, this critic wrote. He said it was modern but not revolutionary and its quality was undisputed. Hirsch's subjects at this time were mainly buildings: structures without human presence. Critics described his paintings as cool, reserved, and somewhat aloof. The critic for the Sun said they showed "a moment when everything stops". Their design was flat. The colors were muted and harmonious with a "purity and clarity of color like things painted on porcelain or silk". They possessed an "intellectual austerity" but were nonetheless said to convey the essential character of a scene.

Hirsch's drawing, House, of 1920 shows some influences of Cézanne and the cubists in its juxtaposed panels and emphasis on the two-dimensional surface of the paper. Its spare, geometric design was typical of his style during this decade. His painting, Lower Manhattan, of either 1920 or 1921, is one of his best-known pieces. It possesses the "essential flatness" of most of his output and shows his artistic skill in its overall design, coloration, and balanced tonal relations.

Hirsch's paintings and drawings in the 1920s were not all in the manner of his urban landscapes. His 1919 drawing of flowers on a table with note cards and knife is realistic with a tonal balance and clarity that would later be recognized as distinguishing his best work. In 1924 he showed a "monumental nude" at the Bourgeois Gallery in New York and, that same year, he made a lithograph showing the heads of three women in hats and coats. A rural landscape, Pastoral Scene, New England, painted in 1926, contrasts sharply with his cityscapes in its rounded contours and blue- and red-toned palette. In 1927 he showed a circus scene at that year's Salons of America exhibition which a critic found to be witty and more flexible than his "mathematically exact" paintings. In his solo exhibit at the Bourgeois Galleries that same year he showed three portraits (Mrs. Catherine Grossman, Dr. Michael Ringer, and A Young Girl). In 1928 he showed a painting called Lilies of the Valley in an exhibition at the Downtown Galleries and the following year he produced a whimsical drawing called "Stuart Davis Mailbox" which shows the back of a woman holding a small American flag beside a mechanical letterbox contraption with human features, in profile. At about the same time he painted a rural landscape, Horse Pasture, described as showing clean outline and peaceful horizons.

== Life events: 1920s ==
In 1922 Hirsch was a founding director and recording secretary of the Salons of America. Hamilton Easter Field created the Salons as an alternative to the Society of Independent Artists which he felt unfairly was giving preferential treatment to some of its members. Hirsch would remain as a director and would continue to show at the Salons exhibitions until 1936.

In 1927 Hirsch was given his first solo exhibition. This event took place at the Bourgeois Gallery, New York. Two years later, with Robert Laurent, Wood Gaylor, and Yasuo Kuniyoshi, Hirsch established the Field Foundation. Using a legacy from Hamilton Easter Field, the foundation was run by artists to help other artists by purchasing their work.

== Mature style: 1930s ==
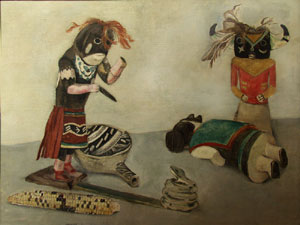
Kachinas by Stefan Hirsch, 1929, oil on Canvas, 20 x 26 inches

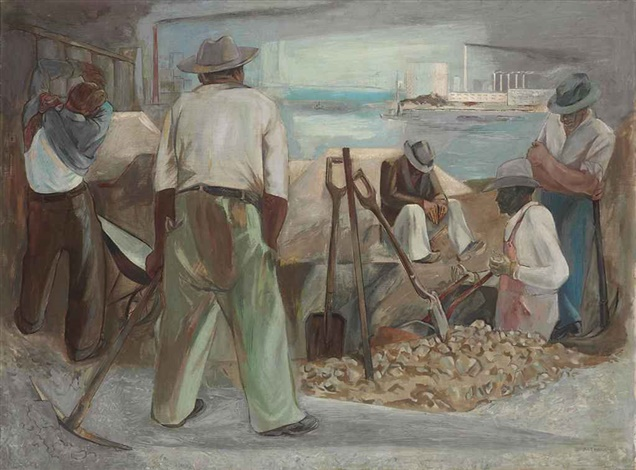
Construction of Roosevelt Highway by Stefan Hirsch, ca. 1930, oil on canvas, 30 x 40 inches

The paintings, drawings, and lithographs that Hirsch made in the 1930s were mainly in the social realist style of the time. Like other artists, he made murals as well as doing easel work. In these pieces there is little evidence of the precisionist influence that had marked much of his work in the 1920s. His colors were bolder and the paintings showed more depth.

Some of the most colorful paintings came from visits he made to Mexico from 1929 to 1933. A small one, Kachinas shows the same careful handling of tones and balancing of pictorial elements as in his earlier work, but its colors are intense and its treatment realistic. The figures shown are Hopi spirit-figures, one of whom is performing a ritual snake dance. Other subjects from these trips include burros, a bullfight scene, musicians, and an allegorical painting of a priest, soldiers, a man with a bag of money, and three peasants slumbering.

Hirsch's social realist style can be seen in Construction of Roosevelt Highway of about 1930 shows five dark-skinned laborers, none facing the viewer, all having postures showing resignation or despondence. Industrial buildings spewing smoke and a set of grain elevators appear in the background.

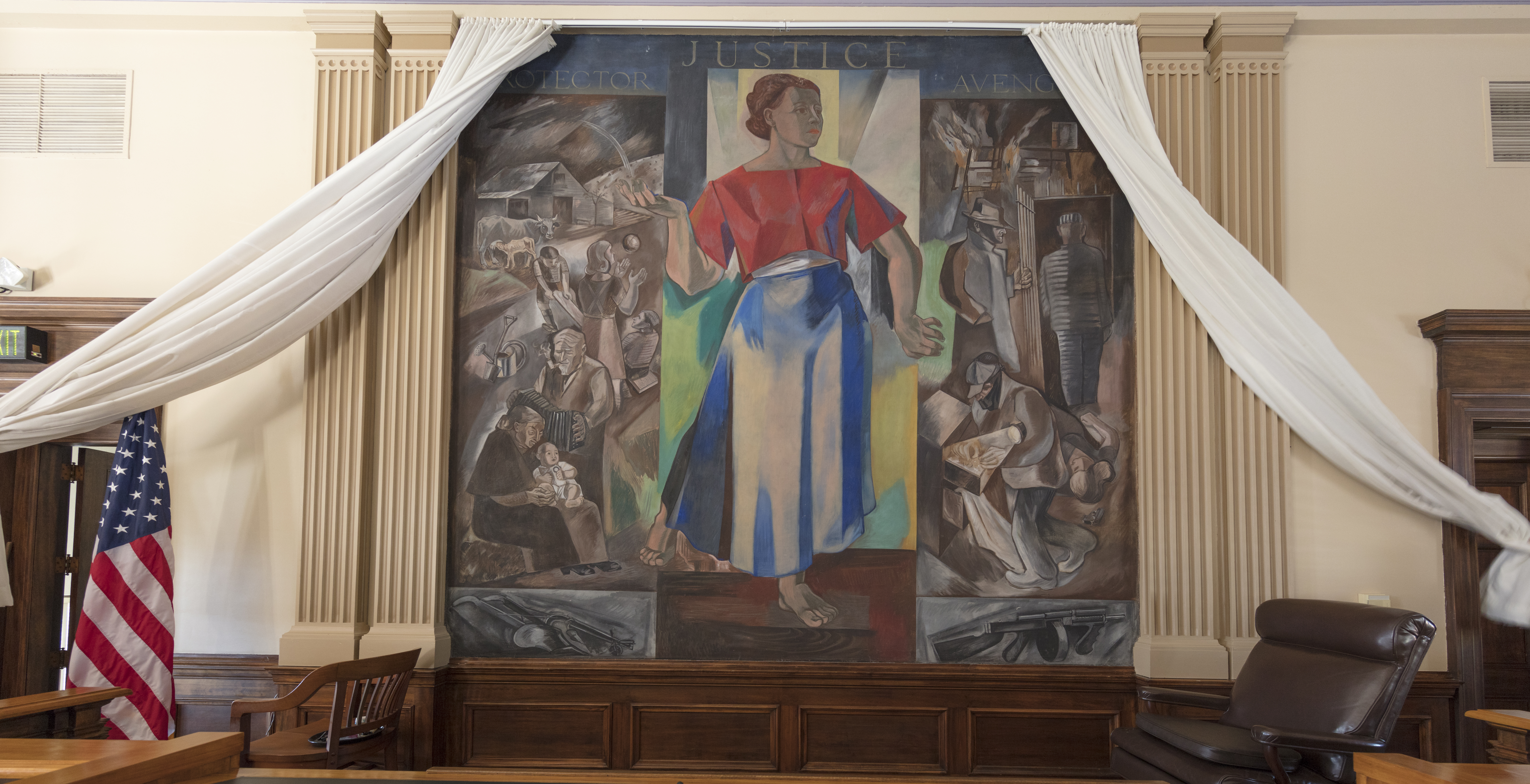
Justice as Protector and Avenger (1938), Hirsch's mural at Charles E. Simons Jr. Federal Court House, Aiken, South Carolina

Early in the 1930s, Hirsch experimented with surrealism. In 1932 he showed two paintings, Pent House and Encounter, which a critic said were effective without revealing the depths of the human psyche. A first mural, Dispatcher, was shown at the Grand Central Galleries in 1935 by arrangement with the Mural Painters Society of which he was a member. Between 1934 and 1937 he contributed his time and materials to paint a number of murals in the auditorium of Lenox Hill House, New York. The social realist panels depict "Recreation," The Desire to Build," "The Desire to Learn," "Cultural Pursuits," and other subjects. In 1938 he took a commission from the Federal Art Project to paint a mural in the Federal Courthouse in Aiken, South Carolina. Called Justice as Protector, the mural had a central figure whose dark skin offended the court's judges and the mural was consequently covered by a drape for many years. Five years later he was given a commission by the U.S. Treasury Department for a post office mural in Booneville, Mississippi. This one, called Scenic and Historic Booneville showed no dark-skinned people and occasioned no local controversy, but there was disagreement between Hirsch and the Treasury Department's Section of Fine Arts. He wished to paint a Civil War skirmish that took place near Booneville and when that was refused, he painted a war-related scene of home-front family members and overseas servicemen writing and reading letters.

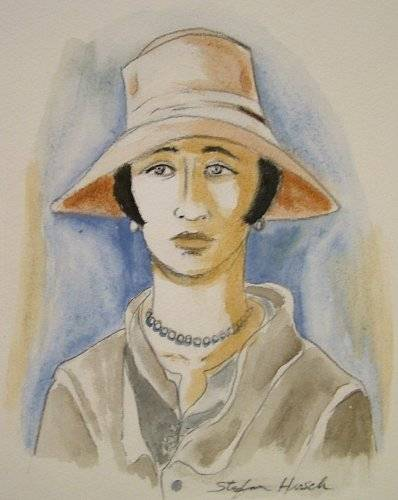
Woman Portrait by Stefan Hirsch, 1940, watercolor, 9 x 7 inches

Hirsch's solo exhibition at the Associated American Galleries in 1941 summarized his easel work of the previous decade. It included cityscapes (Fiftieth Street and Queensboro Bridge) and social-realist figures (Matador, Muleteer, and Quitting Time) from Mexico and New York, as well as a landscape (New England February), and domestic scenes (Wash Day andDomestic Still Life). Edward Alden Jewell of The New York Times said these works varied from one another in style with the more recent canvases showing "a simply integrated design" and "agreeable color harmonies".

== Life events: 1930s ==
During his travels in Mexico from 1929 to 1933, Hirsch became friends with David Siqueiros and Diego Rivera and in January 1932 wrote a letter to The New York Times praising the Mexican government's support for its artists.

From 1919 when he and his parents returned from Germany until 1931 when he married the teacher and artist, Elsa Rogo, Hirsch had lived in his parents' house in Columbia Heights, Brooklyn.

While continuing to produce paintings and other art, Hirsch began a second career in art instruction. His first teaching job, at Bennington College, Bennington, Vermont, began in 1934 and continued until 1940.

== Later life and work ==
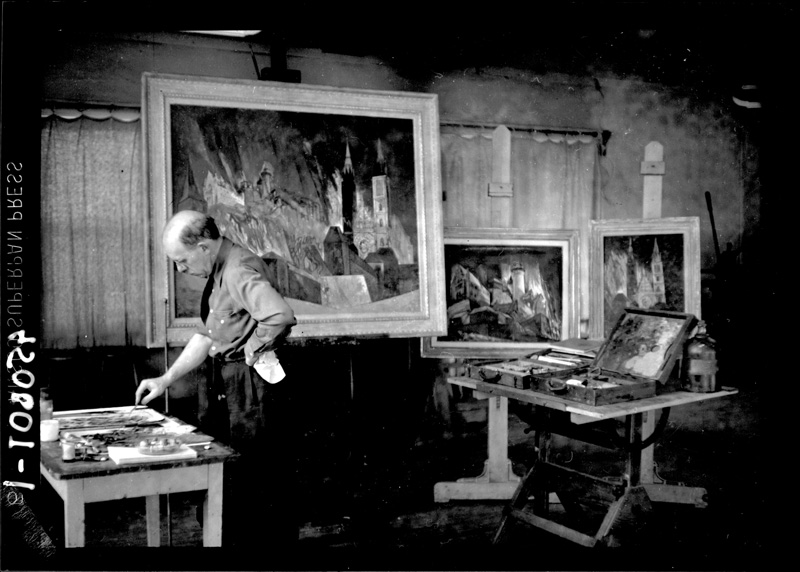
Stefan Hirsch, shown working on several drafts of his painting, The Bombing of Nuremberg, 1947. The completed canvas now hangs in the president's office, Bard College.

From 1940 to 1946, Hirsch taught at the Art Students League of New York. From 1942 until his retirement in 1961 he taught at Bard College and was for most of that time chairman of the art department.

In 1941 Hirsch participated in a controversy about experimentation in art in The New York Times. Edward Alden Jewell of the Times had received a letter from a man named Samuel M. Kootz issuing a blanket condemnation of the previous decade's output by American painters and calling for experiments to break free from a complacent sameness of output. Hirsch responded to the effect that quality in art wasn't so much dependent on simply being new as it was on fresh interpretation of timeless themes and techniques.

== Family ==
Hirsch's father, Angelo Hirsch, was born on April 11, 1863, in Roth, Bavaria, Germany. He emigrated to New York in 1886 and died there aged 74 on August 1, 1937. He was the son of Gerson Hirsch, Jr. Hirsch's mother was Florence Thurnauer (May 17, 1874 to July 21, 1929) who was the daughter of William Thurnauer and Mina Thurnauer. Both parents were American citizens at the time of Hirsch's birth. Hirsch had a sister, Dorothy, who was ten years younger than he. Hirsch lived with his parents (and after his mother's death with his father) until his marriage on January 25, 1931, to Elsa Rogo The couple had no children. In 1932, Rogo was head of an art school for Mexican children in Taxaco. They lived in Bennington, Vermont, when Hirsch taught at the college there and lived in Annandale-on-Hudson, New York when he taught at Bard.

== Collections ==
The sources for this selective list are accounts in New York newspapers.

- Addison Gallery of American Art, Phillips Academy, Andover, Massachusetts
- Bard College, Annandale-on-Hudson, New York
- Brooklyn Museum, New York
- Columbus Museum of Art, Columbus, Georgia
- Corcoran Gallery, Washington, D.C.
- Dallas Museum of Art, Dallas, Texas
- Dartmouth College, Dartmouth, New Hampshire
- Greenville County Museum of Art, Greenville, South Carolina
- Metropolitan Museum of Art, New York
- Newark Museum, Newark, New Jersey
- Phillips Collection, Washington, D.C.
- Print Club of Albany, Albany, New York
- Robert Hull Fleming Museum, University of Vermont, Burlington, Vermont
- Vassar College, Poughkeepsie, New York
- Whitney Museum of American Art, New York
- Worcester Art Museum, Worcester, Massachusetts

== Exhibitions ==
The sources for this selective list are accounts in New York newspapers.

- 1919 Society of Independent Artists
- 1922 Society of Independent Artists
- 1922 A.E. Field Memorial Exhibit at Brooklyn Museum, New York
- 1923 Brooklyn Society of Modern Artists at the Plymouth Institute, New York
- 1924 Bourgeois Galleries, New York
- 1924 Wanamaker Gallery, New York
- 1926 Phillips Memorial Gallery
- 1927 First one-man show, Bourgeois Gallery, New York
- 1927 Downtown Gallery, New York
- 1927 Salons of America, New York
- 1928 Salons of America at Anderson Galleries, New York
- 1929 Downtown Gallery, New York
- 1930 Museum of Modern Art, New York
- 1931 Salons of America at Anderson Galleries, New York (this was the 10th annual show, presumably he showed in all)
- 1931 Downtown Galleries, New York
- 1931 Dwight Art Memorial, Mount Holyoke College, Mount Holyoke, Massachusetts
- 1932 G.R.D. Gallery, New York
- 1932 Solo Exhibition, Downtown Gallery, New York
- 1932 Painters' and Sculptors' Guild, New School for Social Research, New York
- 1934 Downtown Gallery, New York, Field Foundation Painting and Sculpture
- 1935 Gallery of Living Artists, Brooklyn Museum
- 1937 Grand Central Galleries, New York, Mural Painters Society
- 1941 One-man show, Associated American Artists Galleries, New York
- 1941 Whitney Museum of American Art, New York
- 1942 André Seligman, New York
- 1951 Woodstock Art Gallery, Woodstock, New York
- 1977 Retrospective, Bard College, Annandale-on-Hudson, New York
- 2015 "Precisely Not: Works from the Stefan Hirsch and Elsa Rogo Collection", Bard College, Annandale-on-Hudson, New York
