= Peggy Bacon =

American artist

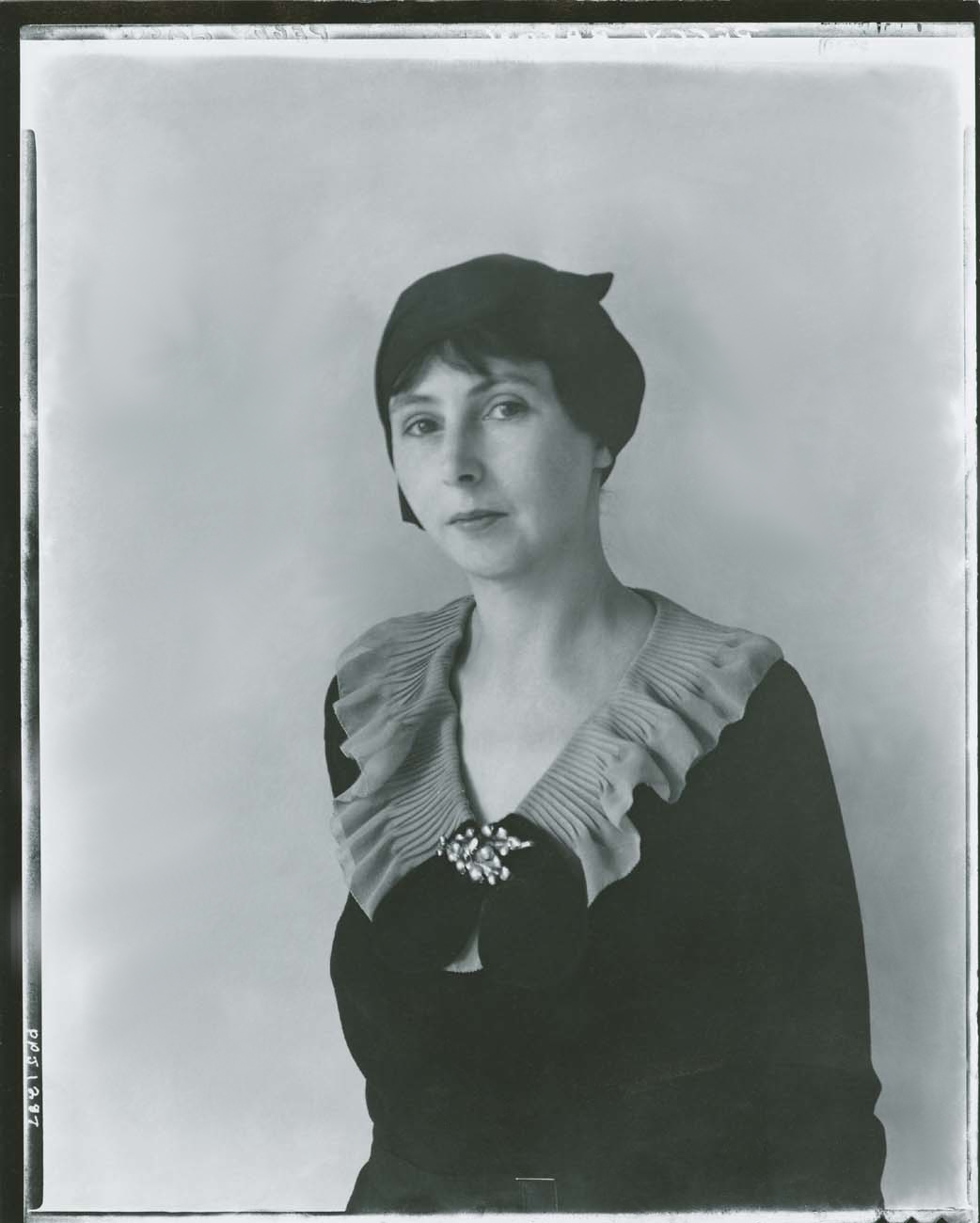
- Born: Margaret Frances Bacon; May 2, 1895; Ridgefield, Connecticut, United States
- Died: January 4, 1987 (aged 91); Kennebunk, Maine, United States
- Known for: Painting, illustration

Margaret Frances Bacon (May 2, 1895 – January 4, 1987) was an American artist, best known for her satirical caricatures.

Bacon studied under Kenneth Hayes Miller at the Art Students League of New York, where she taught herself drypoint and published her first caricatures in the student magazine. They soon appeared in publications such as The New Yorker and Vanity Fair, as well as major art galleries. Bacon earned many awards, including the Guggenheim Fellowship for creative work in the graphic arts.

== Early life and education ==
Bacon was born on May 2, 1895, in Ridgefield, Connecticut, to Charles Roswell Bacon and Elizabeth Chase Bacon. She was the first of three children but raised an only child after her two younger brothers died in infancy. Bacon's parents were both artists and met while attending the Art Students League in New York. Her father, an errand boy for Tiffany's during his childhood, painted landscapes and figures in adulthood while her mother was a miniaturist. Both of her parents were very well read; they loved reading Henry James and would read aloud as a family every evening.

From an early age, Bacon displayed an interest in art. It is said she first started to draw at the age of eighteen months. In her adolescent years she added illustrations and poetry to her letters to family and wrote and illustrated books for her parents Christmas and birthday presents. As she grew older, she earned money by designing dinner place cards depicting historical and literary figures.

Bacon's parents moved frequently and would have tutors for Bacon wherever they went. The family lived in Connecticut but spent winters in New York and in the winter of 1902 they lived in Nassau, Bahamas. They also spent time in Pas de Calais and London. Between the ages of 9 and 11 Bacon lived with her parents in France, first in Paris and then in a house in Picardy at Montreaux-sur-Mer. Bacon's mother did not believe in formal schooling and as a result, for most of her childhood, Bacon had tutors and studied only subjects of interest to her, such as Latin, Greek, mythology, ancient history and geography of the ancient world. Bacon described her unconventional childhood as "absolutely delightful." Her youth was very sheltered; she was often accompanied by a governess, most of which she hated. The only time she really had freedom from this life was when her family was living in Nassau and her parents and grandmother were quarantined because they had contracted typhoid fever.

At the age of fourteen, Bacon began attending Kent Place School, a boarding school in Summit, New Jersey. In 1913, the same year she graduated, Bacon's father killed himself in his studio in New York. He had overcome alcoholism but was susceptible to bouts of depression. After this devastating event Bacon and her mother moved to New York City and lived on the West Side in the home of family friends.

== Artistic career ==
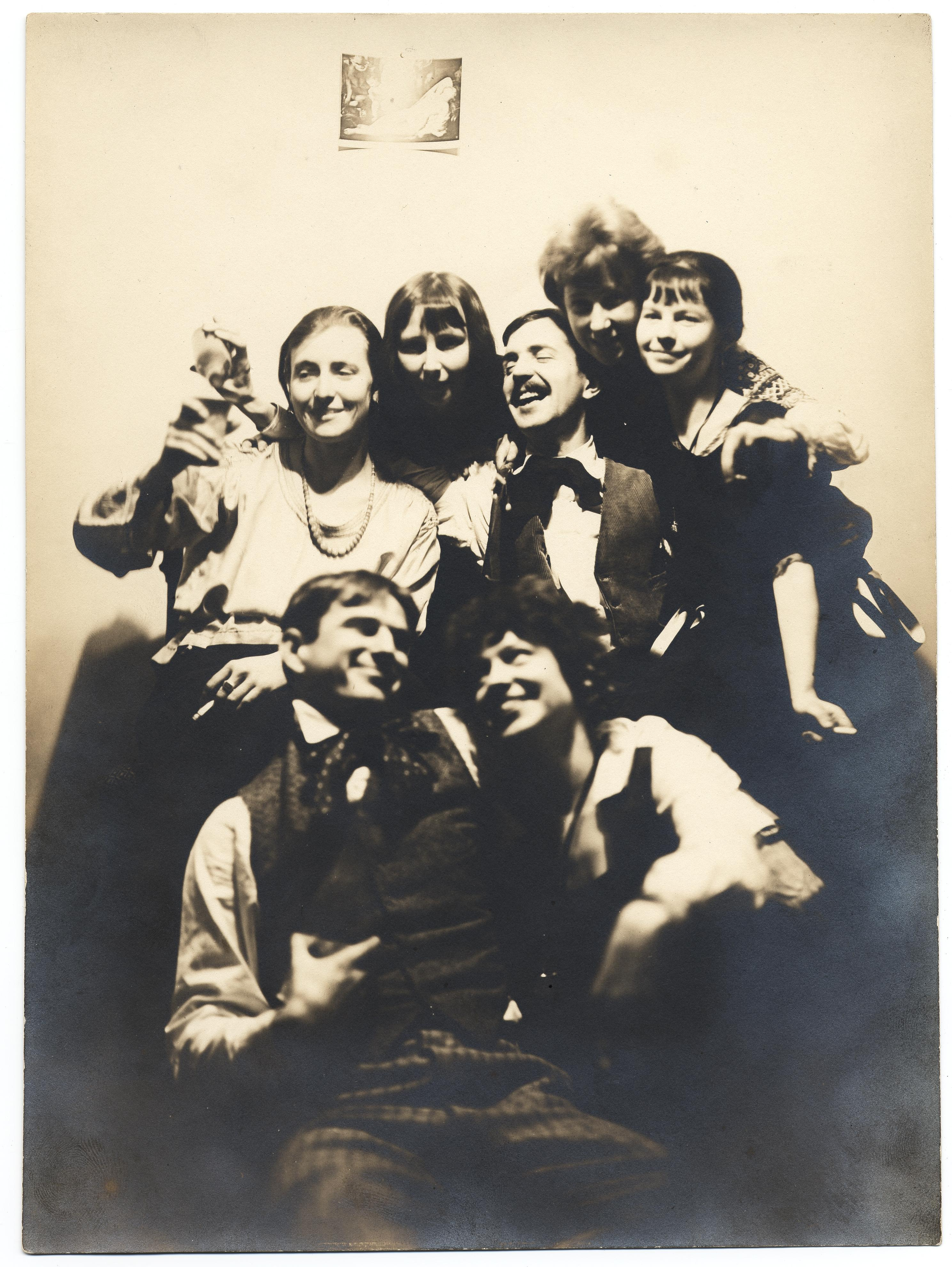
Peggy Bacon, Alexander Brook, Isabella Howland, Katherine Schmidt Shubert, Betty Spencer, Niles Spencer, and Dorothy Varian at a party at the home of Yasuo Kuniyoshi (c. 1921)

Bacon had always been interested in art and from a very young age her early artistic interests were encouraged and supported by her parents. Although Bacon started drawing when she was a year and a half old, she did not receive formal training in art until after graduating from Kent Place School. At the end of 1913, Bacon first studied art at the School of Applied Design for Women but disliked it calling it, "the prissiest, silliest place that ever was." She transferred after a few weeks to the School of Fine and Applied Arts on the West Side where she took classes in illustration and life drawing. During the summer of 1914 Bacon attended Jonas Lie's landscape class in Port Jefferson, Long Island. In the fall of 1914 and spring of 1915, Bacon took a private course with Lie, studying gouache and watercolor. Impressed with her work, Lie put on Bacon's first solo exhibition in his studio. Lie matted, hung, and priced the small paintings and invited one hundred friends to see them. Although the show received few, if any, critical reviews, it sold out, and the proceeds financed Peggy’s first year of study at the Art Students League in 1915-16”

From 1915 until 1920, Bacon studied painting with Kenneth Hayes Miller, John Sloan, George Bellows, and others at the Art Students League. While at the League, Bacon became friends with several other artists. Her circle of friends and acquaintances included Dorothea Schwarcz, Anne Rector, Betty Burroughs, Katherine Schmidt, Yasuo Kuniyoshi, Molly Luce, Dorothy Varian, Edmund Duffy, Dick Dyer, David Morrison, and Andrew Dasburg. Looking back at her time at the League Bacon said, "The years at the Art Students League were a very important chunk of life to me and very exhilarating. It was the first time in my life, of course, that I had met and gotten to know familiarly a group of young people who were all headed the same way with the same interests. In fact it was practically parochial." In 1917, she exhibited two works in the First Annual Exhibition of the Society of Independent Artists (April 10-May 6, 1917). Around 1917 Bacon also became interested in printmaking and taught herself drypoint as there was no one teaching etching at the Art Students League at the time. Bacon's first caricature prints were featured in the single-issue, satirical magazine Bad News, which was published by Bacon and her fellow art students in 1918. Drypoint was Bacon's primary medium until 1927, and pastels until 1945. Although Bacon had trained as a painter, she eventually became famous for her satirical prints and drawings. Her early portrait caricatures in Bad News, like her early drypoints, depended upon a hard, controlling outline, filled in with shading or an obscure pattern. Bacon's pastel portraits are distinguished by their intensity of the hues, highly selective and organized palette, and visually satisfying compositions. Bacon was featured in solo shows in prominent galleries such as Stieglitz's Intimate Gallery, the Weyhe Gallery, and the Downtown Gallery.

In the summer of 1919, Bacon studied with Andrew Dasburg in Woodstock, New York. That same summer she was engaged to American painter Alexander Brook and the two married on May 4, 1920. After marrying, Bacon and Brook moved to London for a year, where their daughter, Belinda, was born. When they returned, the family divided their time between Greenwich Village and Woodstock, New York, two vibrant artist communities. In 1922 a son, Sandy, was born in Woodstock. In 1940, Bacon and her husband divorced.

Bacon was a very prolific artist. In 1919, at the age of 24, she wrote and illustrated her first book, The True Philosopher and Other Cat Tales. She went on to illustrate over 60 books, 19 of which she also wrote, including a successful mystery book, The Inward Eye, which was nominated for an Edgar Allan Poe Award in 1952 for best novel. Bacon's popular drawings appeared in magazines such as The New Yorker, New Republic, Fortune, and Vanity Fair and she exhibited in galleries and museums frequently. Bacon had over thirty solo exhibitions at such venues as Montross Gallery, Alfred Stieglitz's Intimate Gallery, and the Downtown Gallery. In 1934 Bacon was awarded the Guggenheim Fellowship for creative work in the graphic arts. During her time as a fellow she completed 35 satirical portraits of art world figures for a collection called Off With Their Heads!, which was published that same year by Robert M. McBride & Company. In 1942 she was granted an award from the American Academy of Arts and Letters and in 1980 the Academy awarded her a gold medal for her lifelong contribution to illustration and graphic art. In 1947, Bacon was elected into the National Academy of Design as an Associate member, and became a full member in 1969. In December 1975, the National Collection of Fine Arts, now the National Museum of American Art, honored Bacon with a yearlong retrospective exhibition titled, "Peggy Bacon: Personalities and Places." Bacon was also a member of the Society of American Graphic Artists and participated in many of their annual exhibitions.

In addition to her artistic career, Bacon taught extensively during the 1930s and 1940s at various institutions, including the Fieldston School, the Art Students League, Hunter College, the Corcoran Gallery in Washington, D.C., and summers at the School of Music and Art in Stowe, Vermont.

== Bacon's philosophy of caricatures ==
The aim of a caricature is to heighten and intensify to the point of absurdity all the subject's most striking attributes; a caricature should not necessarily stop at ridiculing the features but should include in its extravagant appraisal whatever of the figure may be needed to explain the personality, the whole drawing imparting a spicy and clairvoyant comment upon the subject's peculiarities.

— Peggy Bacon

While Bacon was known for her caricatures, she stopped creating these works after 1935 because of the negative reactions she received from her subjects. Oftentimes, she was commissioned to create satirical portraits of people who were often unwilling to sit for her and "after she had captured their likenesses by some means, complained bitterly about what she had done to them”

== Later life and legacy ==
In the 1970s Bacon's eyesight began failing and she eventually went to live in Cape Porpoise, Maine. She died on January 4, 1987 at the age of 91 in Kennebunk, Maine.

From April 28, 2001 – September 2, 2001, the Philadelphia Museum of Art exhibited The World of Peggy Bacon, displaying drawings and prints of hers.

From June 27, 2012, to November 4, 2012, the Lawrence A. Fleischman Gallery at the Donald W. Reynolds Center for American Art and Portraiture exhibited Six Degrees of Peggy Bacon. The exhibit traced her associations using photographs, letters, graphics, and archival documents from the Archives of American Art to illustrate Bacon’s connection to dozens of other prominent artists.

From June 14, 2024 to February 2, 2025, the Portland Museum of Art exhibited "Peggy Bacon: Biting, never Bitter." The exhibit examined "wry observations of her social, professional, and artistic networks during the 1920s and 1930s."
