= Robert Laurent =

American sculptor

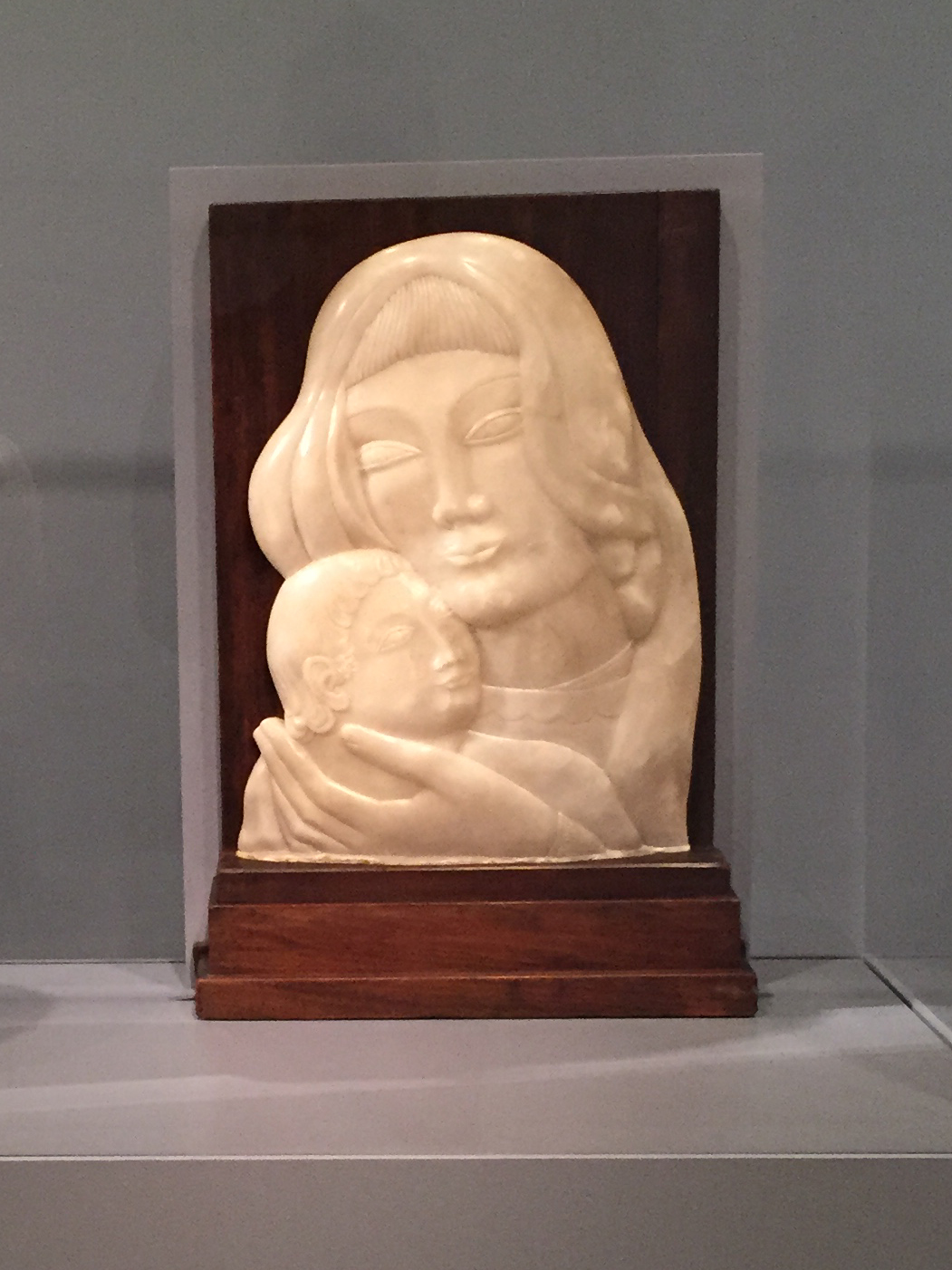
- Mother and Child, ca. 1924, alabaster relief in wood frame, Smithsonian American Art Museum, Gift of John N. Stern, 1996.89A-B
- Born: June 29, 1890; Concarneau, France
- Died: April 20, 1970 (aged 79); Cape Neddick, Maine
- Education: British Academy
- Known for: American Pioneer of "Direct Carving." Co-Founder of The Ogunquit Summer School of Graphic Arts (Maine)
- Notable work: Sculpture at Radio City Music Hall
- Movement: Modernism
- Spouse: Mimi Caraes
- Awards: National Institute of Arts & Letters, National Sculpture Society, American Academy in Rome, Sculptor's Guild

Robert Laurent (June 29, 1890 – April 20, 1970) was a French-American modernist figurative sculptor, printmaker and teacher. His work, the New York Times wrote,"figured in the development of an American sculptural art that balanced nature and abstraction." Widely exhibited, he took part in the Whitney's 1946 exhibition Pioneers of Modern Art. Credited as the first American sculptor to adopt a "direct carving" sculpting style that was bolder and more abstract than the then traditional fine arts practice, which relied on models, Laurent's approach was inspired by the African carving and European avant-garde art he admired, while also echoing folk styles found both in the U.S. and among medieval stone cutters of his native Brittany. Best known for his virtuoso mastery of the figure, Laurent sculpted in multiple media, including wood, alabaster, bronze, marble and aluminum. His expertise earned him major commissions for public sculpture, most famously for the Goose Girl for New York City's Radio City Music Hall, as well as for Spanning the Continent for Philadelphia's Fairmount Park. After the Depression, he was also the recipient of several Works Progress Administration (WPA) Federal Art Project commissions under the New Deal, including a bas-relief called Shipping for the exterior of Washington, D.C.'s Federal Trade Commission Building, commissioned by the Treasury Department's Section of Fine Arts in 1938.

== Background ==
Laurent was born the son of French peasants in Concarneau, Brittany, France in 1890. His skill in art was recognized by Brooklyn Eagle art critic, painter and collector Hamilton Easter Field who mentored him, taught him to paint and served as Laurent's surrogate father for the rest of his life.

In 1908, Field took Laurent to Rome, where he trained with Maurice Sterne and wood carver Giuseppe Doratori, before formally studying at the British Academy. Upon graduation, Laurent moved permanently to the U.S. at age twenty, only to quickly return to Europe as a member of the navy during the First World War. In Europe, Laurent traveled to his native Brittany where he met Mimi Caraes, who became his wife.

Field died in 1922, leaving Laurent his Brooklyn home, the Ogunquit school they had co-founded and an art collection, which Laurent later used to establish as the Hamilton Easter Field Foundation with the help of other New York artists.

== The Ogunquit Summer School of Graphic Arts ==
In the summer of 1902, Field and 12-year-old Laurent traveled to Ogunquit, Maine, a popular destination for artists, drawn by the landscape. During their stay, Field "bought a row of shacks that he started renting out cheap to artists." In 1911, Field and Laurent built a studio there and co-founded the Ogunquit Summer School of Graphic Arts. Field taught drawing and painting until his death, and Laurent taught sculpture and wood carving there for the next 50 years.

There was, however, another art school in Ogunquit. Founded by Field's former teacher, Charles Woodbury's Ogunquit Summer School of Drawing and Painting was heavily influenced by the "regional impressionist" style of painting also known as the Boston School. One of the school's more famous students was Edward Hopper. Field and Laurent were, conversely, committed modernists, and appealed to more experimental students and colleagues, such as Marsden Hartley, Yasuo Kuniyoshi, Niles Spencer, gallery owner Edith Gregor Halpert and curator Holger Cahill, among others. Together, the two schools transformed a town of fewer than 1,000 into Maine's largest art colony, an achievement that resulted, in 1953, in the opening of the Ogunquit Museum of American Art.

== Public collections ==
Public collections across the United States hold Laurent's work, including the Art Institute of Chicago, the Metropolitan Museum of Art, MOMA, the Whitney Museum of American Art, the National Gallery of Art, the Smithsonian Art Museum, the Brooklyn Museum, the Hirshhorn Museum and Sculpture Garden, the Addison Gallery, Indiana University and the Terra Foundation for Art, among others.

== Awards and honors ==
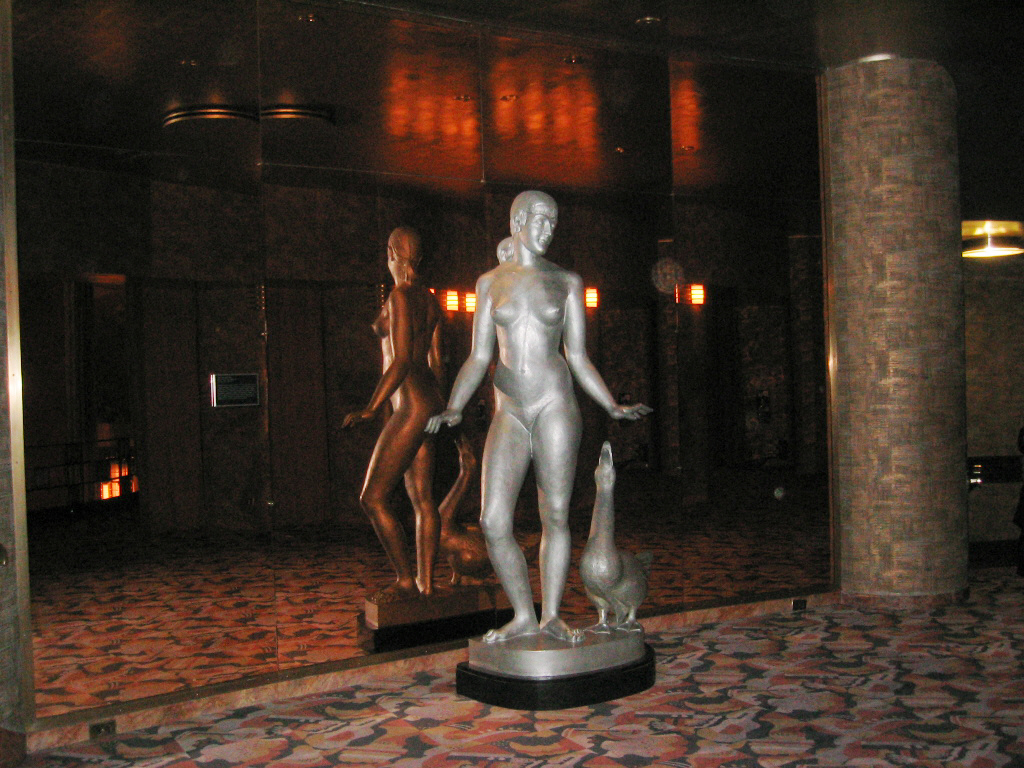
Robert Laurent, Goose Girl, ca. 1932, cast aluminum, Radio City Music Hall, New York City

In 1938, Laurent won the second of two Logan Prizes at the Art Institute of Chicago's annual American art exhibition. In 1945, he won the Audubon Sculpture Award in New York, several first prizes in Hoosier salons, and in exhibits at the John Herron Museum, Indianapolis. He received high distinction in 1954 when was named sculptor in residence at the American Academy in Rome for a year.

Laurent was also one of 23 American sculptors whose works were selected for the controversial American National Exhibition in Moscow, in 1959. The exhibit, which included such celebrated artists as sculptors Ibram Lassaw and Isamu Noguchi and painters Hyman Bloom, Jackson Pollock and Edward Hopper was coordinated by the United States Information Agency (USIA), and liberal critics subsequently characterized it as a Cold War American "propaganda strategy." Prior to the exhibition, the House Un-American Activities Committee (HUAC) threatened to remove many of the artists who had been accused of links to communist activities. After President Eisenhower intervened, however, the exhibition went on as planned.

Laurent was a fellow of the National Sculpture Society, president of the Hamilton Easter Field Foundation, and a member of the Sculptor's Guild – Indiana Artists, New England Sculptors Association, and the College Art Association. He was also elected to the National Institute of Arts and Letters shortly before his death at the age of seventy-nine.

== Academic career ==
Laurent taught at the Art Students League in New York City, the Corcoran Gallery of Art in Washington D.C., Vassar College, and Goucher College. In addition to teaching seasonally at the Ogunquit School until 1961, Laurent accepted a position as Professor of Fine Arts at Indiana University, a position he held from 1942 to 1960. He had notable students including Margit Varga.

== Family ==
Laurent's son, John, was a prominent painter in Maine, known for his landscapes and seascapes.
