= Margit Varga =

American artist, art editor, gallerist

- Born: Margaret Varga; May 5, 1908; New York City, New York, U.S.
- Died: April 8, 2005 (aged 96); Naples, Collier County, Florida, U.S.
- Education: National Academy of Design, Art Students League of New York
- Occupation(s): Artist, gallerist, art editor, art director, journalist
- Spouse: Laszlo Kormendi

Margit Varga (1908–2005) was an American artist, gallerist, journalist, art director, and art editor. Her artwork has been described as "magical realism" and her work was known in the New York City-area and in Europe. Varga owned a Midtown art gallery for emerging artists in the 1930s. She was an art authority and served as a judge for art exhibitions in the 1930s and 1940s. Varga worked for Time magazine for 40 years.

== Biography ==
Margit Varga was born on May 5, 1908, on the Upper East Side of Manhattan in New York City, to parents from Hungary. She studied art at the National Academy of Design; and at the Art Students League of New York, under Boardman Johnson and Robert Laurent.

Varga established the Painters' and Sculptors' Gallery at 22 East 11th Street in Manhattan in 1932. The gallery showed emerging artists for the next 3 years. Varga worked for 40 years as an art editor and art director of Time magazine, starting in 1936. Varga lived in a townhouse at 739 Washington Street in the West Village until 1995, when she sold the building to Dorothy Lichtenstein.

Varga died on April 8, 2005, in Naples, Florida. Her artwork can be found in museum collections including the Museum of Fine Arts, Boston, Pennsylvania Academy of the Fine Arts, the Metropolitan Museum of Art, and Gilcrease Museum.
