= Alexander Brook =

American painter

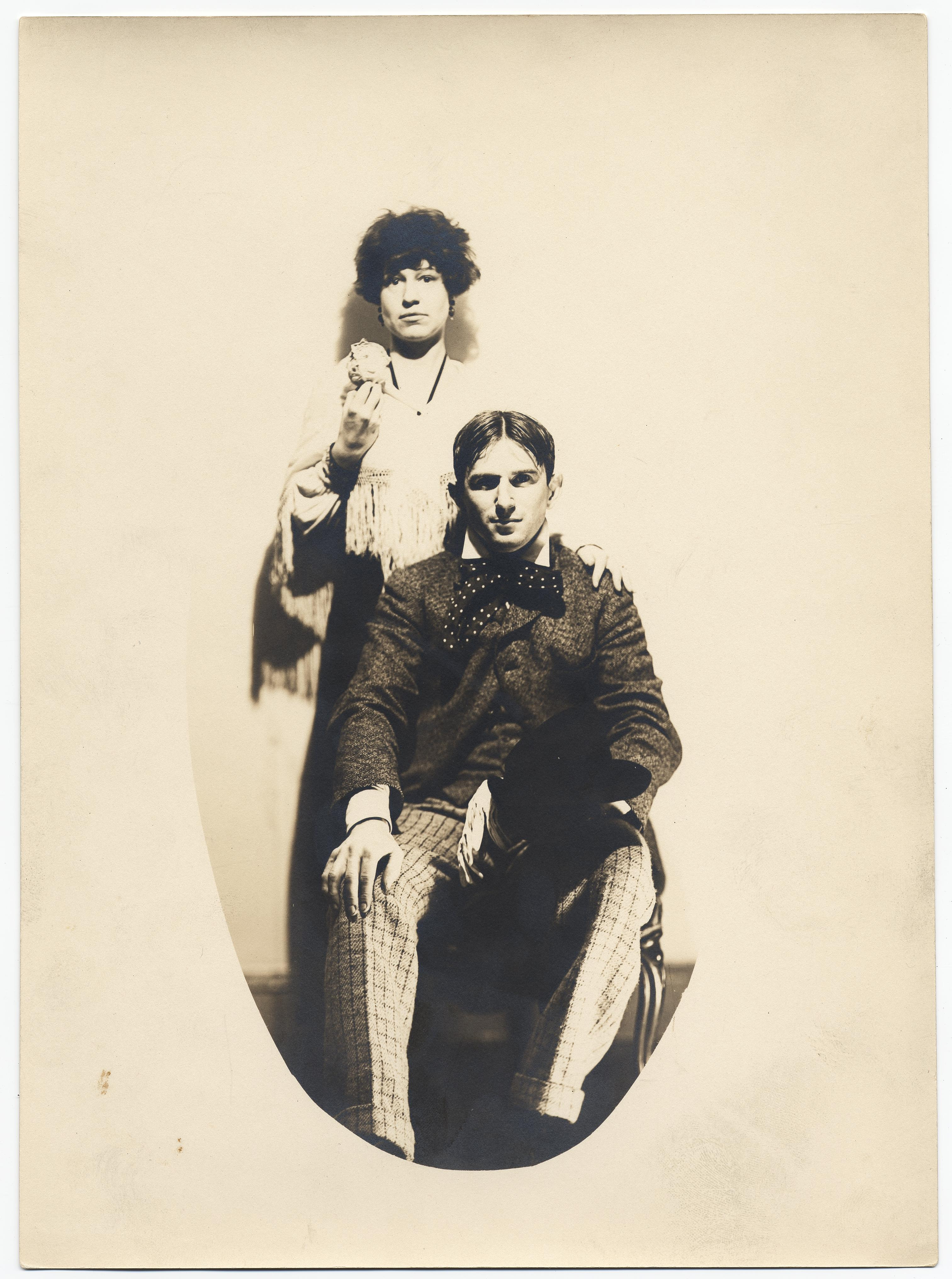
- Alexander Brook with Betty Spencer (c. 1921)
- Born: July 14, 1898; Brooklyn, New York, U.S.
- Died: February 26, 1980 (aged 81)
- Education: Art Students League of New York
- Known for: Painting
- Spouse(s): Peggy Bacon (m. 1920–c.1940; divorce), Libby Bergere, Gina Schnauffer (m. 1945–1980; death)

Writing the Family Letter, mural, 1939. Currently in the William Jefferson Clinton Federal Building

Alexander Brook (July 14, 1898 – February 26, 1980) was an American artist, teacher, and art critic, known for his paintings. He was active from 1910 until 1966.

== Biography ==
Brook was born in Brooklyn, New York on July 14, 1898, to a Russian family. At the age of twelve he was bed-ridden with polio. It was during this time that he received his first lessons in painting. In 1914 he entered the Art Students League of New York, where he studied for four years with Kenneth Hayes Miller, John Christen Johansen, Frank DuMond, George Bridgman, and Dimitri Romanovski. There he met the painter Peggy Bacon, whom he married in 1920. Brook also studied at the Pratt Institute.

During his twenties, Brooks painted still lifes and posed figures with vigor and sensuality. He later began to emulate the style of Jules Pascin. From 1924 to 1927 he was the assistant director of the Whitney Studio Club. He also worked as a reviewer for The Arts magazine. His realist painting was exhibited widely and he won multiple awards. Children's Lunch won the Frank G Logan prize at the Art Institute of Chicago in 1929 and Georgia Jungle won the Carnegie Prize at the Carnegie International art exhibition in 1939. He also received the Temple gold medal at the Pennsylvania Academy in 1931 and a gold medal at the Paris International Exhibition in 1937. Unfortunately for Brook, the realist style fell out of favor late in the 1940s.

Brook taught at the Art Students League of New York from 1933 until 1936 and again from 1942 until 1943.

About 1940, he was divorced from Peggy Bacon. After a second marriage to Libby Bergere and spells living in Savannah, Georgia, in 1945 he married his third wife, the painter Gina Knee. In 1948 they moved to Sag Harbor on eastern Long Island, where he retired from painting around 1965.

His work can be found at a variety of museum collections, such as the Whitney Museum, the Metropolitan Museum, the Art Institute of Chicago, and the Albright-Knox Gallery.
