= Niles Spencer =

American painter (1893–1952)

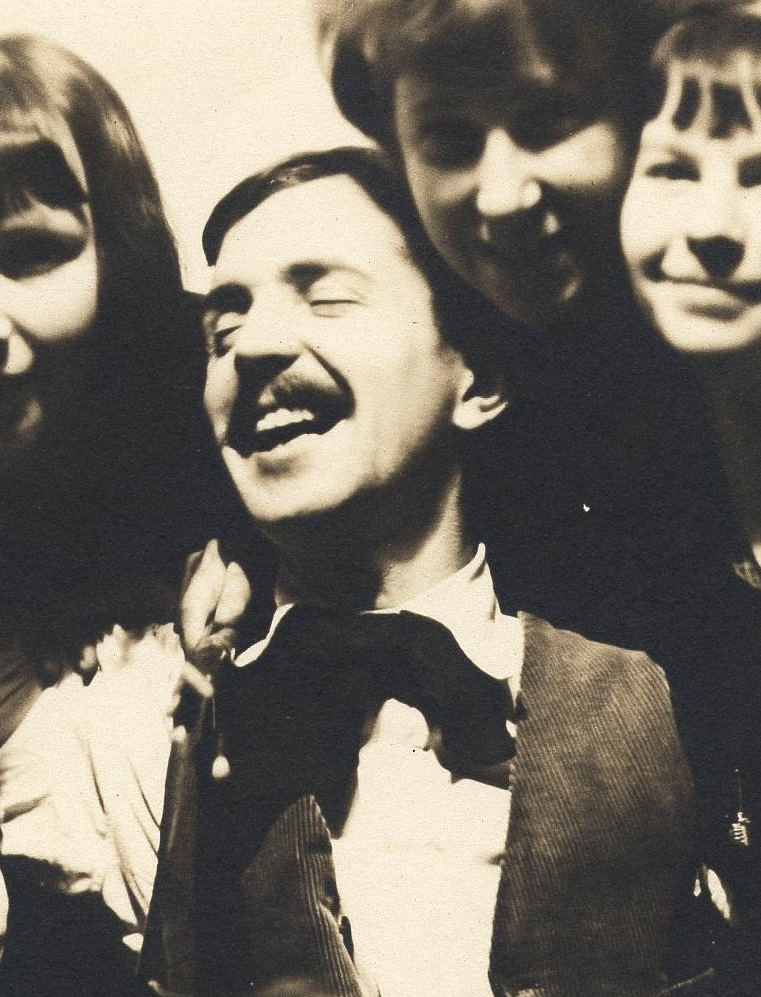
- Spencer c.1921
- Born: 16 May 1893. Pawtucket, Rhode Island, US
- Died: 15 May 1952 (aged 58); Dingmans Ferry, Pennsylvania, US
- Education: Rhode Island School of Design
- Occupation: Artist (painter)

Niles Spencer (16 May 1893 – 15 May 1952) was an American painter of the Precisionist School who specialized in depicting urban and industrial landscapes. His works are in the permanent collections of several major museums including the Metropolitan Museum of Art, the Whitney Museum of American Art, and MoMA.

== Selected works ==
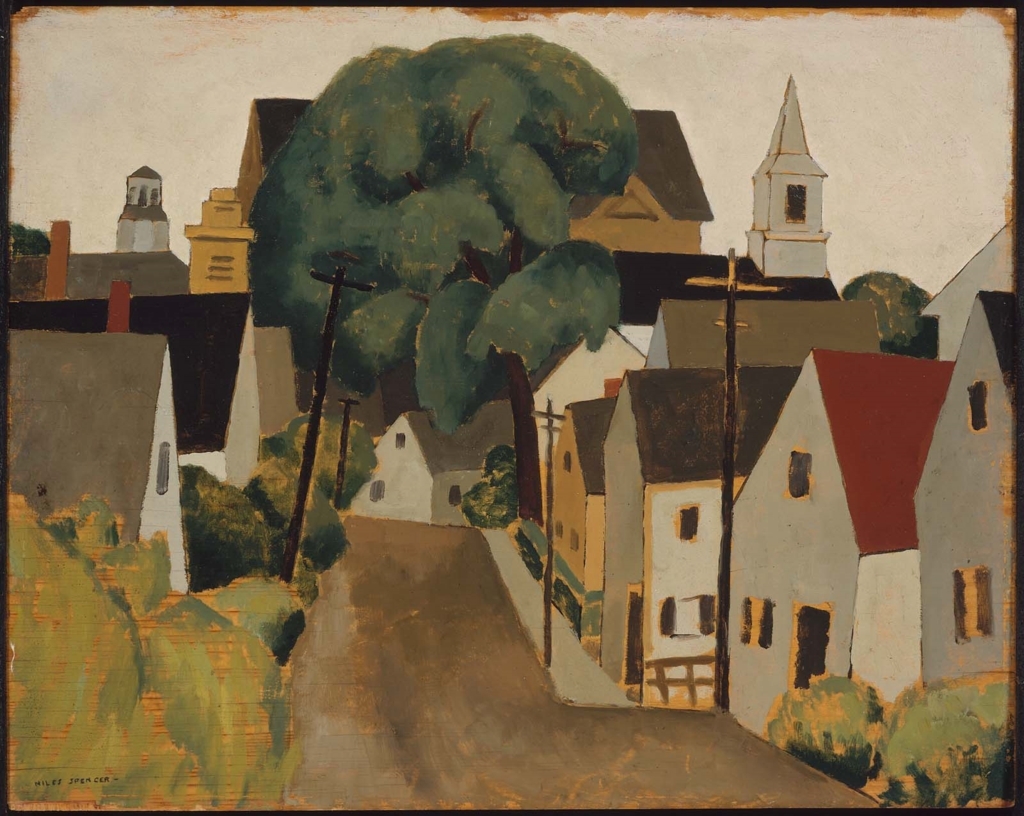
Down the Hill (1924), Museum of Fine Arts, Boston

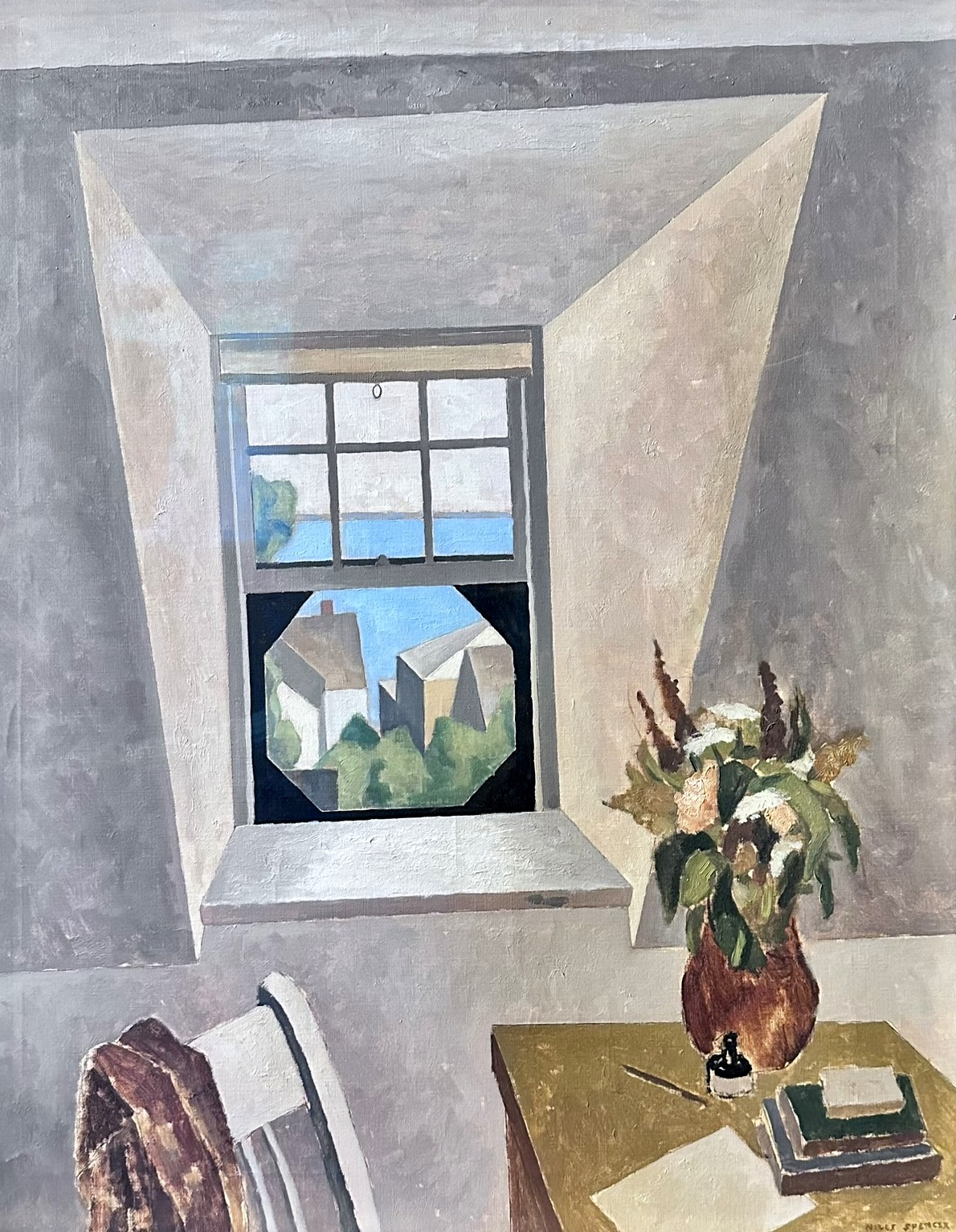
The Dormer Window (1927), The Phillips Collection

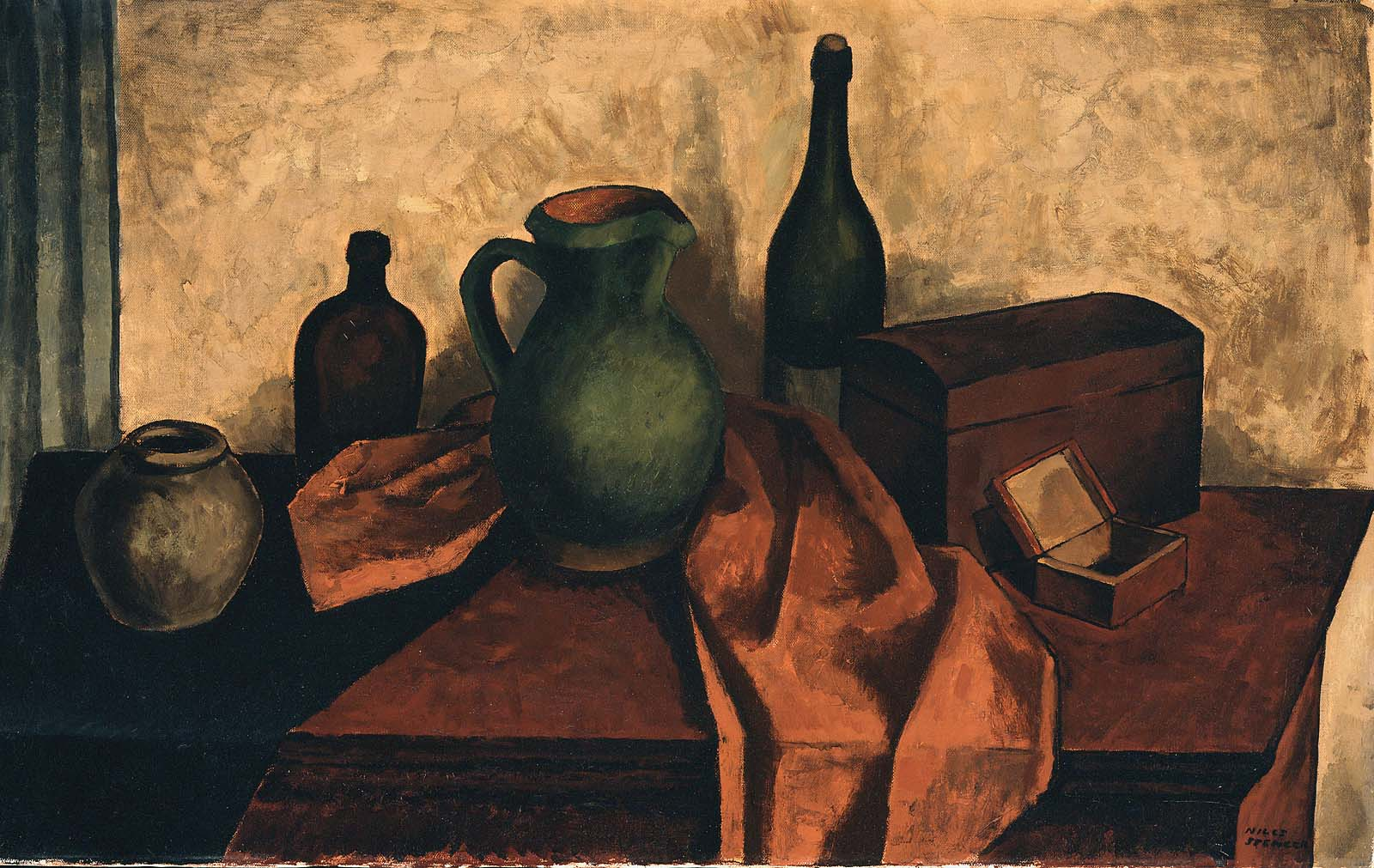
The Red Table (1927), Museum of Fine Arts, Boston

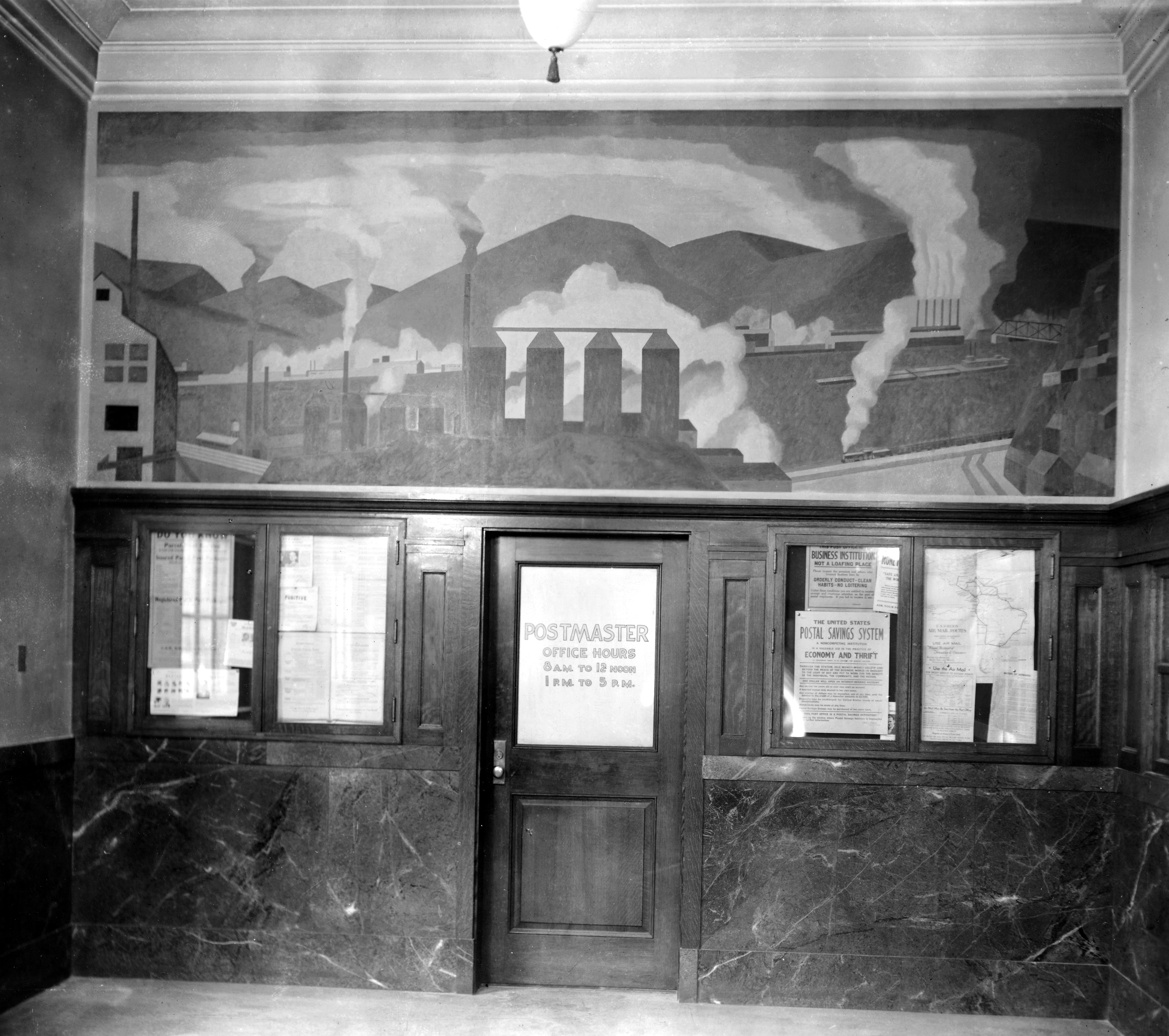
Western Pennsylvania (1938), mural for the United States post office in Aliquippa, Pennsylvania, that is now preserved at the Smithsonian American Art Museum
