= Jason Schoener =

American painter

Jason Lloyd Schoener (1919 – 1997) was an American painter and teacher.

== Biography ==
Jason Lloyd Schoener was born in 1919 in Cleveland, Ohio, son of Harry and Ida (Finkelstein) Schoener. Jason was also the nephew of the artist William Zorach and cousin of artist Dahlov (Zorach) Ipcar. He studied at the Cleveland Institute of Art, Case Western Reserve University, the Art Students League of New York, and Columbia University. After serving in the Navy, at Eniwetok Atoll, during World War II, Schoener started his teaching career at the Jersey Preparatory School in Jersey City. He moved on to the Munson-Williams-Proctor Arts Institute where he taught sculpture, ceramics and crafts. In 1953 he began teaching at the California College of Arts and Crafts and continued as a teacher and administrator there for more than forty years. Jason and his wife, Virginia Worley Schoener, spent nearly every summer of their marriage at their summer home and studio in Georgetown, Maine, just down the road from the Zorach farm. Jason Schoener died at his home in Oakland, California, in 1997.

== Paintings ==
Schoener’s early paintings were narrative and featured the working men and women he encountered in his daily life. By mid-career, Jason was primarily painting abstract landscapes in brilliant and often surprising color. His work was influenced by his teaching, his travel, and those with whom he exhibited around the country. Jason Schoener showed his work frequently, from coast to coast. Between 1960 and 1983 Schoener exhibited primarily at Midtown Gallery in New York, under the direction of Alan D. Gruskin. His fellow exhibitors included Edward Betts, Hans Moller, William Palmer, Waldo Peirce, William Thon, and Robert Vickrey, among many others. Jason Schoener’s work is in the collections of Colby College, Bowdoin College, the Cleveland Museum of Art, the Columbus Museum of Art, the Oakland Museum of Art, the Whitney Museum, the U.S. Naval Academy in Annapolis, the San Francisco Theological Seminary and St. Mary's State College, among others. The Schoener papers are housed in the collection of the Archives of American Art.
