= Samuel Halpert =

American painter (1884–1930)

Samuel Halpert (1884 in Białystok, Russia – 1930 in Detroit, Michigan) was an American painter.

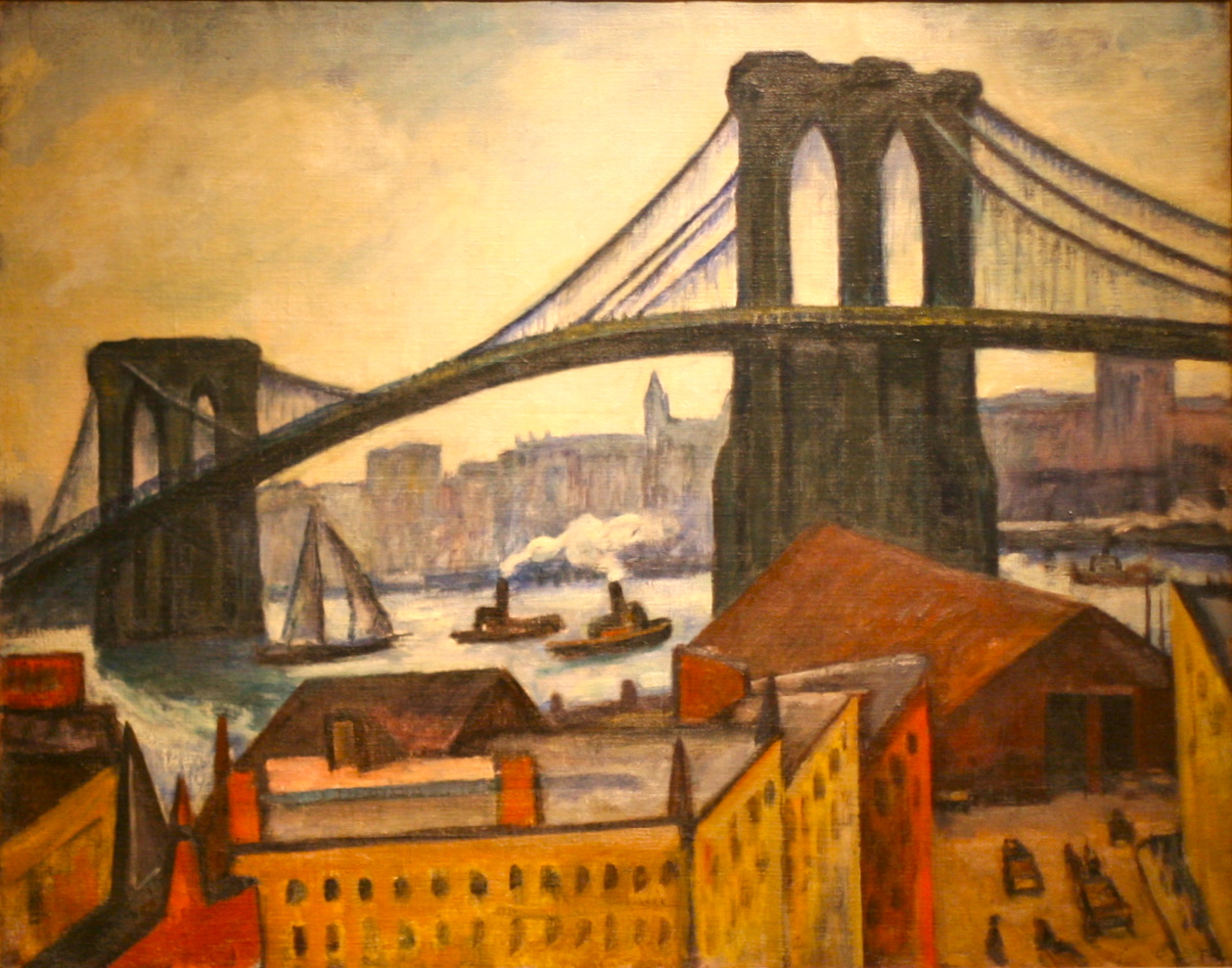
Samuel Halpert - A View of the Brooklyn Bridge - Brooklyn Museum

== Early days ==
Halpert's family migrated to New York City in 1890. His father's preoccupation with religious devotion necessitated that Halpert sell Jewish newspapers, books and candy after school to help support the family. At the Neighborhood Guild, later called University Settlement House, he met Jacob Epstein, who gave him his first instruction in drawing. Halpert studied with Henry McBride at The Educational Alliance from around 1898 to 1902. Beginning in 1899, the young artist also attended the National Academy of Design for three years, and left for France in 1902.

== Travel in Europe ==
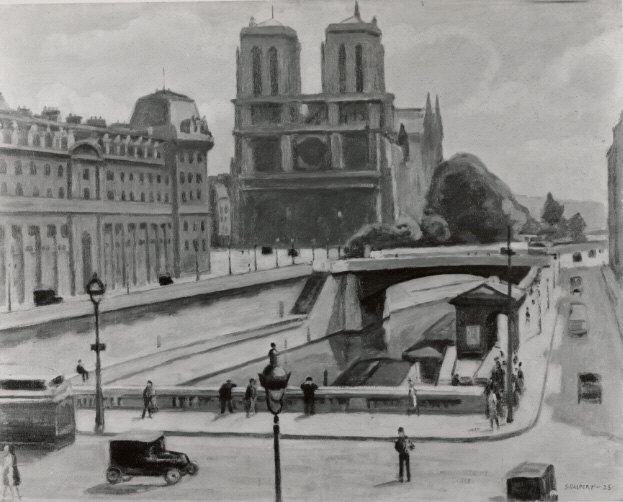
Notre Dame, Paris, Samuel Halbert, Metropolitan Museum of Art

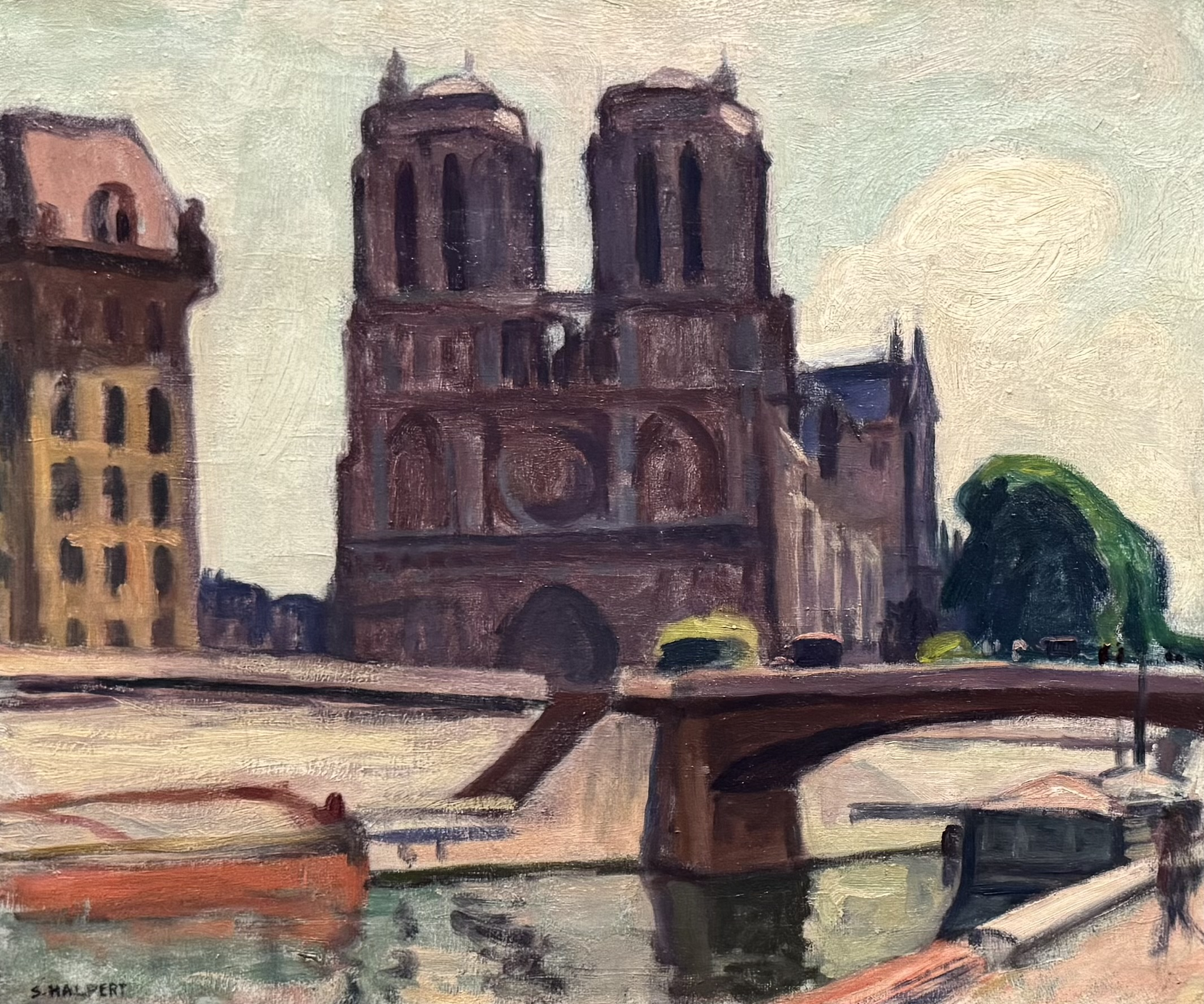
Notre-Dame, Paris, (1905)

Halpert spent his first year in Paris studying under Leon Bonnat at the École des Beaux-Arts. However, upon seeing the work of the Post-Impressionists he left the academy to study independently and to travel. Halpert painted numerous scenes of Paris, in a style reflecting the influence of Impressionism, Cézanne, and the Fauves. Halpert exhibited from 1905 to 1911 at the Salon d'Automne and established strong friendships with the artists Patrick Henry Bruce, Sonia Delaunay and Robert Delaunay, Abel Warshawsky, Thomas Hart Benton, Fernand Léger and Jean Metzinger.

== New York City and his first show ==
In 1912, Halpert returned to New York. He and Man Ray studied under Robert Henri at the Ferrer Center and, in 1913, Halpert left to set up an artists' community in Ridgefield, New Jersey. Other frequenters of the colony were the writer Alfred Kreymborg and the sculptor Adolf Wolff. The next year, his first one-man show was held at the Daniel Gallery. In 1915, Halpert returned to Europe and traveled to France, Spain, London and Portugal (Vila do Conde) with the Delaunays, whose abstract work had little influence on him.

== Career ==
Halpert returned to New York in 1916, and during the next two years exhibited in several People's Art Guild shows. Through the Guild, he met Edith Gregor Fiviosioovitch (Fein) they married in 1918. Halpert joined the Society of Independent Artists in 1917, later becoming a vice president and director. The following year, Halpert also began to exhibit at the Whitney Studio Club. After his marriage, the artist began to also paint nudes, domestic scenes and landscapes, and showed a renewed interest in naturalism. For summer 1925, the couple visited Paris The following year, Edith Halpert opened the Downtown Gallery with Bea Goldsmith, the sister of the couple's close friend Leon Kroll. The gallery represented Ben Shahn, Charles Sheeler, Stuart Davis and other important American modernist artists. during the summers of 1926 and 1927, the Halpert's rented a farmhouse at Perkins Cove in Ogunquit, Maine, an artist colony established by the critic and patron Hamilton Easter Field and frequented by Yasuo Kuniyoshi, Bernard Karfiol and Marguerite and William Zorach, among others.

In fall 1927, Halpert separated from his wife and moved to Detroit to head the painting department at the School of the Detroit Society of Arts and Crafts. He died there three years later.
