= Downtown Gallery =

Coordinates: 40°45′42″N 73°58′13″W

The Downtown Gallery was the first commercial art gallery established in 1926 by Edith Halpert in Greenwich Village, New York City, United States. At the time it was founded, it was the only New York gallery dedicated exclusively to contemporary American art by living artists.

== History ==
In the fall of 1926, Edith Halpert, inspired by the art scene she encountered during her stay in France, decided to establish a platform in the United States where American artists could have similar opportunities. In 1926, with funds from a successful business career as an executive at the S. W. Straus & Company investment bank, Halpert, alongside her friend Berthe Kroll Goldsmith, inaugurated Our Gallery in Manhattan at 113 West 13th Street. The first notable occupant of 113 West 13th Street was Henry Jarvis Raymond, a young Whig journalist who, along with his wife, began raising their first son in the building within a year of its construction. Our Gallery served as a dedicated space for showcasing contemporary American art, often featuring works by artists within Halpert's social circle, including her husband, Samuel Halpert. In the subsequent year of 1927, prompted by the artistic community, particularly artist William Zorach, the gallery underwent a name change to the Downtown Gallery. Early promotional materials for the Downtown Gallery emphasized Halpert and Goldsmith's commitment to artistic quality and enduring value over transient trends, stating: "The Downtown Gallery has no prejudice for any one school. Its selection is driven by quality — by what is enduring — not by what is in vogue."

In 1929, Abby Aldrich Rockefeller became an early customer of the Gallery, during which time Halpert was selling 19th-century pictures and weathervanes that she had gathered from New England. The Downtown Gallery records consist largely of correspondence with collectors, including Edgar and Bernice Chrysler Garbisch, Preston Harrison, Mr. and Mrs. Maxim Karolik, William H. Lane, Abby Aldrich Rockefeller, Beram K. Saklatwalla, Robert Tannahill, and Electra Havemeyer Webb, as well as with dealers such as Robert Carlen, Landau Gallery, Leicester Galleries, Mirski Gallery, and Isabel Carleton Wilde.

In addition to showcasing artworks by women, immigrants, and Jewish artists, the Downtown Gallery notably distinguished itself as one of the first art spaces in New York City to feature the works of African American artists like Jacob Lawrence and Horace Pippin. Notably, during World War II, when the Japanese American painter Yasuo Kuniyoshi faced classification as an enemy alien, the gallery organized an exhibition of his paintings in 1942.

By 1931, the gallery had surpassed $100,000 in revenue. However, the subsequent year witnessed a significant downturn, with revenue plummeting by 50 per cent. In 1935, Edith Halpert became the sole proprietor of the business, overseeing its operations until her death in 1970. Following her demise, her niece, Nathaly Baum, assumed control of the gallery until its closure in 1973.

In 1934, Halpert organized the "Mile of Art" exhibition at Radio City Music Hall with the support of Mayor Fiorello LaGuardia and Nelson Rockefeller to assist artists struggling during the Great Depression. She relocated the Downtown Gallery uptown to 51st Street in 1940 and to 57th Street in 1965. Several works now in the collections of The Metropolitan Museum of Art traveled through the Downtown Gallery, including paintings by Stuart Davis (Men and Machine; 1934), Charles Demuth (Red Poppies; 1929), Charles Sheeler (Americana; 1931), and a 1918 collage by Max Weber, The Apollo in Matisse’s Studio.
