= Ogunquit Museum of American Art =

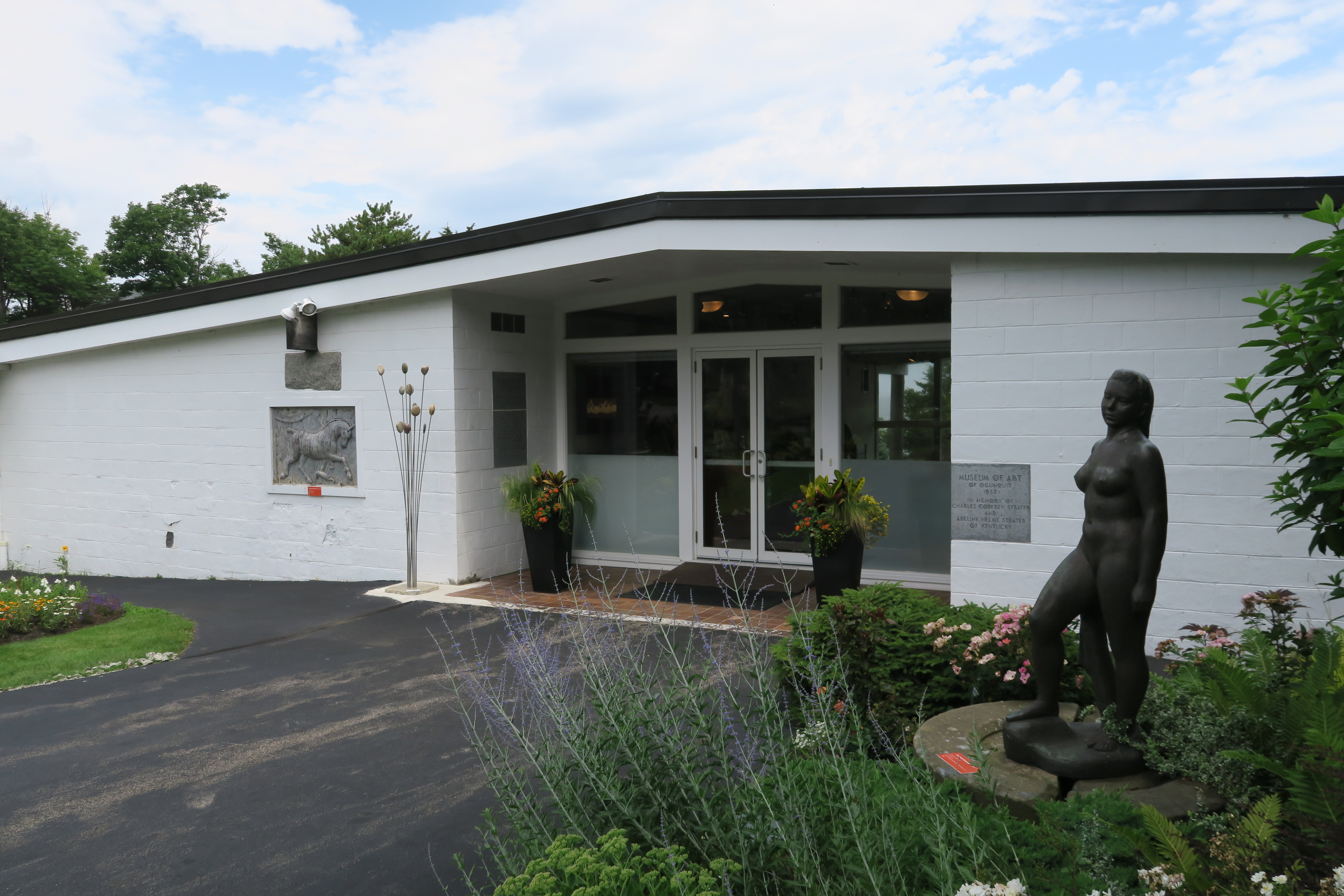
- Former name: Museum of Art of Ogunquit
- Established: 1953
- Location: Ogunquit, Maine
- Coordinates: 43.2338°N 70.5889°W
- Type: Art museum
- Founder: Henry Strater
- Director: Amanda Lahikainen
- Website: ogunquitmuseum.org

The Ogunquit Museum of American Art (OMAA) is an art museum located in Ogunquit, Maine. The Museum officially opened in 1953 and was founded by Lost Generation artist Henry Strater. Situated near Perkins Cove, the Museum and its three acres of sculpture gardens overlook Narrow Cove with views directly over the Atlantic Ocean. OMAA houses a permanent collection of over 3,000 paintings, sculptures, drawings, prints, and photographs spanning from the late 1800s to the present.

== History ==
Artist and collector Henry Strater purchased land in Ogunquit formerly owned by Charles Herbert Woodbury who is widely credited with founding the art colony in the village.

Initially founded by Strater as The Museum of Art of Ogunquit, the institution was incorporated on September 18, 1951, with a mission for “the broad educational interests of the public.” Architect Charles Worley of Boston designed the museum to realize the full potential of the site on the coast. Strater commissioned architect Charles S. Worley Jr. to design the building it is housed in. The museum opened its doors to the public on July 25, 1953.

The first exhibition included 121 works by modern artists Marsden Hartley, John Marin, Stuart Davis, Yasuo Kuniyoshi, Peggy Bacon, Walt Kuhn, Frances Lamont, Hamilton Easter Field, and William von Schlegel, and was supported with the loan of important works from the Metropolitan Museum of Art, The Whitney Museum of American Art and the Downtown Gallery.

In the ensuing decades, the Ogunquit Museum of American Art has organized important exhibitions of modern and contemporary art by Edward Hopper, Andrew Wyeth, Jamie Wyeth, Dahlov Ipcar., Anthony Cudahy, Lee Krasner, and Philip Koch.

Pages from the inaugural exhibition catalog at OMAA

== Collection ==
The museum houses over 3,000 works of art in its permanent collection. Highlights include:

- Important paintings by Yasuo Kuniyoshi, Walt Kuhn and Marsden Hartley
- A complete set of the graphic works of Jack Levine
- A large assortment of ceramic sculpture by Carl Walters
- Works by Will Barnet, Thomas Hart Benton, Charles Burchfield, William Zorach, Marguerite Zorach, Dahlov Ipcar, Alexander Calder, Edward Hopper, Gaston Lachaise, Roy Lichtenstein, and Reginald Marsh.
