= Edith Halpert =

American art dealer (1900–1970)

- Halpert reading at the home of Charles Sheeler, between 1933 and 1942
- Born: Edith Gregoryevna Fivoosiovitch; 1900; Odessa, Ukraine
- Died: 1970 (aged 69–70); New York, NY
- Occupations: American art dealer and collector
- Known for: Downtown Gallery
- Spouse: Samuel Halpert (m. 1918; div. 1930)

Edith Halpert or Edith Gregor Halpert (née Edith Gregoryevna Fivoosiovitch; 1900–1970) was a pioneering New York City dealer of American modern art and American folk art. She brought recognition and market success to many avant-garde American artists. Her establishment, the Downtown Gallery, was the first commercial art space in Greenwich Village. When it was founded in 1926, it was the only New York gallery dedicated exclusively to contemporary American art by living artists. Over her forty-year career, Halpert showcased such modern art luminaries as Elie Nadelman, Max Weber, Marguerite and William Zorach, Stuart Davis, Peggy Bacon, Charles Sheeler, Marsden Hartley, Yasuo Kuniyoshi, Ben Shahn, Jack Levine, William Steig, Jacob Lawrence, Walter Meigs, Arthur Dove, John Marin, Georgia O'Keeffe, and many others. Halpert later expanded her business to include American folk art, and certain nineteenth-century American painters, including Raphaelle Peale, William Michael Harnett, and John Frederick Peto, whom she considered to be precursors to American modernism.

== Early years ==
Halpert was born Edith Gregoryevna Fivoosiovitch to Gregor and Frances Lucom Fivoosiovitch in Odessa (then Russia, now Ukraine) on April 25, 1900. She had a sister, Sonia, five years older. Shortly after the deadly pogroms of October 1905, Halpert immigrated to New York City in 1906 with her mother and sister (her father died in 1904 of tuberculosis). At this time the family name changed to Fivisovitch. They initially settled on the west side of Harlem, then a predominantly Jewish immigrant neighborhood, and Halpert attended the progressive Wadleigh High School for Girls. At the age of 14, she further Americanized her name to Edith Georgina Fein and began to pursue a career as an artist. She studied drawing under Leon Kroll and Ivan Olinsky at the National Academy of Design and life drawing with George Bridgeman at the Art Students League. Halpert was able to attend the National Academy of Design at such a young age because she convinced her instructors that she was actually sixteen. She was also a member of the Whitney Studio Club and John Weischel's People's Art Guild, a radical artists' cooperative for which she served as treasurer.

In 1917, she met the American painter Samuel Halpert through the People's Art Guild, and they married the following year. The couple remained in New York City, where Samuel continued to paint while Halpert worked to support them. In the 1920s and 1930s, marriage was still a popular goal among young women. While many young women worked, most stopped after marriage. However, Halpert continued to work to support her household while Samuel stayed home to paint. In 1925, they lived at the Maison Watteau in Montparnasse, then Paris's liveliest artist community. The following summer, the Halperts stayed at the artist colony founded by Hamilton Easter Field in Ogunquit, Maine. They rented a cottage from Robert Laurent, and mingled with other American artists who were residing there that summer: Stefan Hirsch, Bernard Karfiol, Walt Kuhn, Yasuo Kuniyoshi, Katherine Schmidt, Niles Spencer, and Marguerite and William Zorach, all of whom would later join her gallery. Many of the artists in Ogunquit were interested in folk art and used it to decorate their homes and as inspiration in their work.

Samuel and Halpert divorced in 1930, just before his untimely death caused by streptococci meningitis.

== Business career ==
Halpert's career began early. In order to support herself and her mother (and later, her husband), Halpert took a number of jobs in rapid succession and became a highly successful businesswoman. At the age of 16, she worked at Bloomingdale's department store, first as a comptometer operator and then as an illustrator in the advertising department. She then worked in the foreign office of Macy's, before becoming an advertising manager at Stern Brothers, eventually working as an efficiency expert for the garment manufacturers Cohen-Goldman and Fishman & Co. Between 1920 and 1925, Halpert served in several roles with S.W. Straus & Company, the bank investment firm that originated real-estate mortgage bonds. "By 25, she was one of two female business executives in the city and quite well-off." Halpert had earned a substantial salary and was appointed to the board of directors. Despite her success and high status, she quit her association with Straus at her husband's urging in 1925. This left her with more time to devote to her marriage, and gave her an opportunity to refocus her ambitions on the business of art. Upon Halpert's resignation, she and Samuel traveled to Paris, France, and stayed for nearly a year.

== Opening The Downtown Gallery ==
While staying in France, Halpert noticed that French artists had more opportunities to sell and display art than their American counterparts. After returning to the U.S., Halpert decided to create a space where she could provide similar opportunities. Flush from bonuses earned in her business dealings, in the fall of 1926, Halpert used that money to open Our Gallery in Manhattan at 113 West 13th Street with her friend Berthe Kroll Goldsmith. The gallery featured contemporary American art, often by friends of Halpert and her husband, artist Samuel Halpert. The following year 1927, the name of the gallery changed to the Downtown Gallery at the suggestion of artist William Zorach. In early brochures, Halpert and Goldsmith described their mission thus: "The Downtown Gallery has no prejudice for any one school. Its selection is driven by quality — by what is enduring — not by what is in vogue."

== The Downtown Gallery, American Folk Art Gallery, and The Daylight Gallery ==
The American Folk Art Gallery, founded by Holger Cahill in partnership with Halpert and Goldsmith, opened in 1929 as the first folk art gallery, installing itself upstairs from the Downtown Gallery. The affinity between Halpert's artists and folk art was strong, and sales of folk art sustained the Downtown Gallery through the Depression. Regular devotees included Abby Aldrich Rockefeller, and Halpert drew on their relationship to convince Rockefeller to provide support for the Museum of Modern Art and, later, The Downtown Gallery. A third space, operating behind the main gallery, opened in 1930. Called the Daylight Gallery, it emphasized art and sculpture displayed in diffuse natural light, and featured elaborate iron silhouette doors Halpert had commissioned in 1929. In a press release, Halpert referred to the new gallery as “a modest moment in American Art.”

== Fortifying The Downtown Gallery ==
Halpert's business acumen helped her manage prices, and encourage collectors of modest means. Halpert also used marketing and advertising, and worked to get her artists included in museums and public collections to increase their exposure. After buying out Goldsmith in 1935, Halpert winnowed her stable of artists down to twelve, and focused on profitability. In 1940, the gallery relocated to 43 East 51st Street and, in 1945, she moved again, this time to 32 East 51st Street.

As an advisor for the WPA Federal Art Project, Halpert had access to many artists outside of New York, many of whom she exhibited. She also hosted exchange exhibitions with the Boris Mirski Gallery, The Downtown Gallery's similarly avant-garde Boston counterpart.

Halpert also worked to attract artists formerly represented by Alfred Stieglitz who died in 1946. She also took on artists' estates, including one from former Stieglitz artist Arthur Dove. In 1941, Halpert and "her friend Alain Locke, the writer and theorist of black culture, Halpert organized Negro Art in America, a survey of 41 artists that was the first such exhibition in a New York gallery. Not long after, Halpert exhibited Jacob Lawrence's Migration Series, a 60-panel memorial to The Great Migration, which is now owned jointly by MOMA and Washington D.C.'s Phillips Collection.

After 1936, all of Halpert's artists were eventually transferred, without the artists' consent to the Alan Gallery, led by Halpert's assistant director Charles Alan. The Downtown Gallery relocated one last time to the Ritz Tower Concourse at 465 Park Avenue in 1965.

== Contributions to the art world ==
Halpert served as organizer and director of the First Municipal Exhibition of American Art, Atlantic City, New Jersey, in 1929. Her work with the WPA Federal Art Project took her to Washington D.C. in the summer of 1936 to develop the Exhibition and Allocation Program, which facilitated nationwide circulation for works from regional art centers. In 1937, she formed the Bureau for Architectural Sculpture and Murals, a central clearing-house from which architects could review and select work by artists and sculptors experienced in working in architectural settings (similar in mission to her Daylight Gallery). Halpert served as curator of the art section of the American National Exhibition, sponsored by the United States Information Agency and the U.S. Department of Commerce; she traveled to the Soviet Union with the exhibition, installed the show, and gave daily gallery talks in Russian.

In 1952, to promote art history, Halpert established the Edith Gregor Halpert Foundation. Its activities included assisting universities to fund scholarships for the study of contemporary American art and championing the rights of artists to control the sale and reproduction of their work. In recognition of her dedication to the arts, Halpert received the Art in America Award in 1959, a USIA Citation for Distinguished Service in 1960, and the First Annual International Silver Prize from the University of Connecticut for "distinguished contribution to the arts" in 1968.

== Exhibitions ==
- Folk Art Sculpture and the Index of American Design at the Downtown Gallery, New York City, 1937.
- American Modernism: The First Wave, Painting from 1903-1933, presented at Brandeis University Museum of Art, 1963
- Six Decades of American Art, shown at Leicester Galleries, London, 1965
- Image to Abstraction, held at Amon Carter Museum, 1967
- Edith Halpert and the Downtown Gallery, exhibited at the University of Connecticut, 1968. The Edith Gregor Halpert Collection was eventually sold at auction by Sotheby Parke-Bernet, 1973.
- The Jewish Museum's 2019 exhibition Edith Halpert and the Rise of American Art included 100 pieces of Downtown Gallery-related American modern and folk art, as well as items from her personal collection.

== See also ==
- Art dealer
- Art gallery
- Downtown Gallery
- Art Students League
- Index of American Design
- Modern art
- 20th century art
- Folk art of the United States
- Samuel Halpert
