= OMAA =

OMAA may refer to:

- Ogunquit Museum of American Art, an art museum located in Ogunquit, Maine, United States
- OMAA, the ICAO airport code for Zayed International Airport, Abu Dhabi, United Arab Emirates
