= Helen Beling =

American sculptor (1914–2001)

Helen Beling (1914 – March 12, 2001) was an American sculptor.

Beling was a native of New York City who studied at the National Academy of Design and at the Art Students League of New York; her instructors included Lee Lawrie, Paul Manship, and William Zorach. She was a nonobjective sculptor, and worked in a variety of media during her career, including bronze, ceramic, and wood. Her work was exhibited at the Metropolitan Museum of Art and the Whitney Museum of American Art. She died in a nursing home in Bandon, Oregon, and was survived by two daughters.

== Career ==
Beling was a prolific sculpture and teacher at the Westchester County Center and the College of New Rochelle. She worked with a material she called "Belplast" which was fiberglass, a combination of reinforced resin and bronze powder that allowed her work to be lightweight. She was able to travel to Malaysia in 1978 to lecture and also showed some of her work.

“Listen to your teachers. They’ve got a lot to give. Learn from them. Question, understand, search. Fight back! Only you must make your own decisions.” (Beling).

After her death many of her works were stored away until 12 years later they re-surged with the help of Gallery at Gray's who continues to work with the Beling family to bring her works to light.

== Exhibitions ==
Beling's works appeared in locations all over New York like the New Rochelle Art Association, The Bridge Gallery, The Krasner Gallery, the Sabena Airlines Exhibit in Brussels, and the Pennsylvania Academy of Fine Arts. She was also chosen to exhibit in the 1955 Whitney Museum annual exhibit of contemporary artists.

A bronze by Beling, Pose #1, is owned by the Hirshhorn Museum and Sculpture Garden. Several other works were commissioned by synagogues.

== Awards ==
- National Association of Women Artists Medal of Honor
