= Pilar (boat) =

Fishing boat owned by Ernest Hemingway

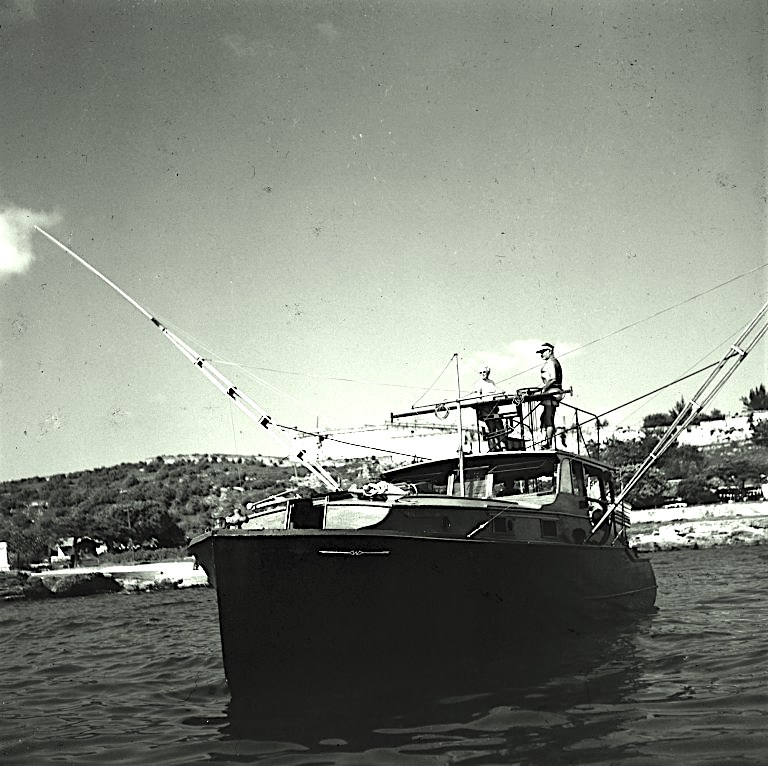
- Ernest Hemingway and Mary Welsh Hemingway aboard Pilar

History
- Name: Pilar
- Owner: Ernest Hemingway
- Builder: Wheeler Shipyard, Inc., Brooklyn, New York
- Cost: $7,495
- Completed: 1934
- Fate: Museum ship

General characteristics
- Length: 38 ft (12 m)
- Beam: 12 ft 0 in (3.7 m)
- Height: 17.5 ft (5.3 m)
- Draught: 3 ft 6 in (1.1 m)
- Installed power: Main Engine – 75 HP Chrysler "Crown Marine" L-head six-cylinder with reduction gears, centrally mounted.; Trolling Engine – 4 Cylinder Lycoming
- Propulsion: 1 main propeller shaft through the keel. The second shaft and propeller offset from the center for trolling engine.
- Speed: 16 knots (30 km/h; 18 mph)

Location of the dry-docked actual boat (At the Hemingway Museum, Havana, Cuba)

Ernest Hemingway owned a 38-foot (12 m) fishing boat named Pilar. It was acquired in April 1934 from Wheeler Shipbuilding in Brooklyn, New York, for $7,495.[1] "Pilar" was a nickname for Hemingway's second wife, Pauline, and also the name of the woman leader of the partisan band in his 1940 novel about The Spanish Civil War, For Whom the Bell Tolls. Hemingway regularly fished off the boat in Key West, Florida, Marquesas Keys, and the Gulf Stream off the Cuban coast. He made three trips by boat to the Bimini Islands, wherein his fishing, drinking, and fighting exploits drew much attention and remain part of the island's history. In addition to fishing trips on Pilar, Hemingway contributed to scientific research, including collaboration with the Smithsonian Institution. Several of Hemingway's books were influenced by time spent on the boat, most notably The Old Man and the Sea (1953) and Islands in the Stream (1970). The yacht also inspired the name of Playa Pilar (Pilar Beach) on Cayo Guillermo. The opening and other scenes in the 2012 film Hemingway & Gellhorn depict a miniature boat replica.

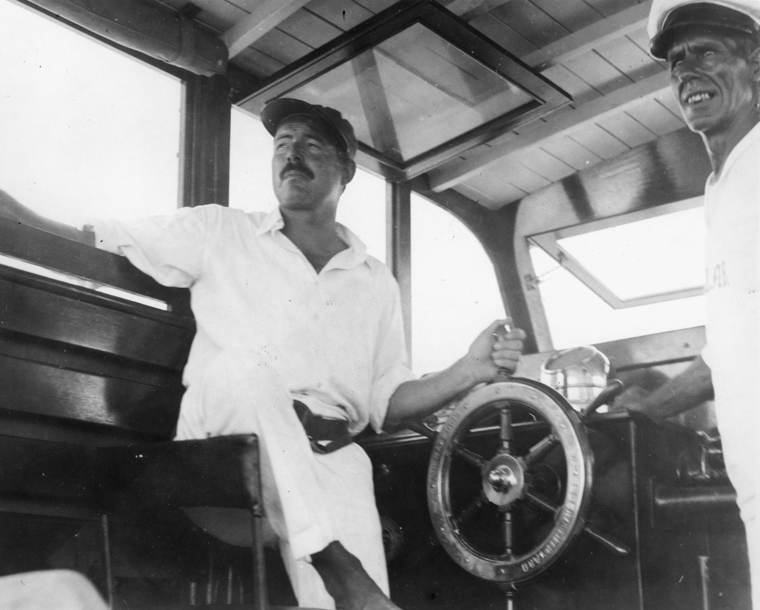
Ernest Hemingway and Carlos Gutierrez aboard Pilar

== Acquisition ==
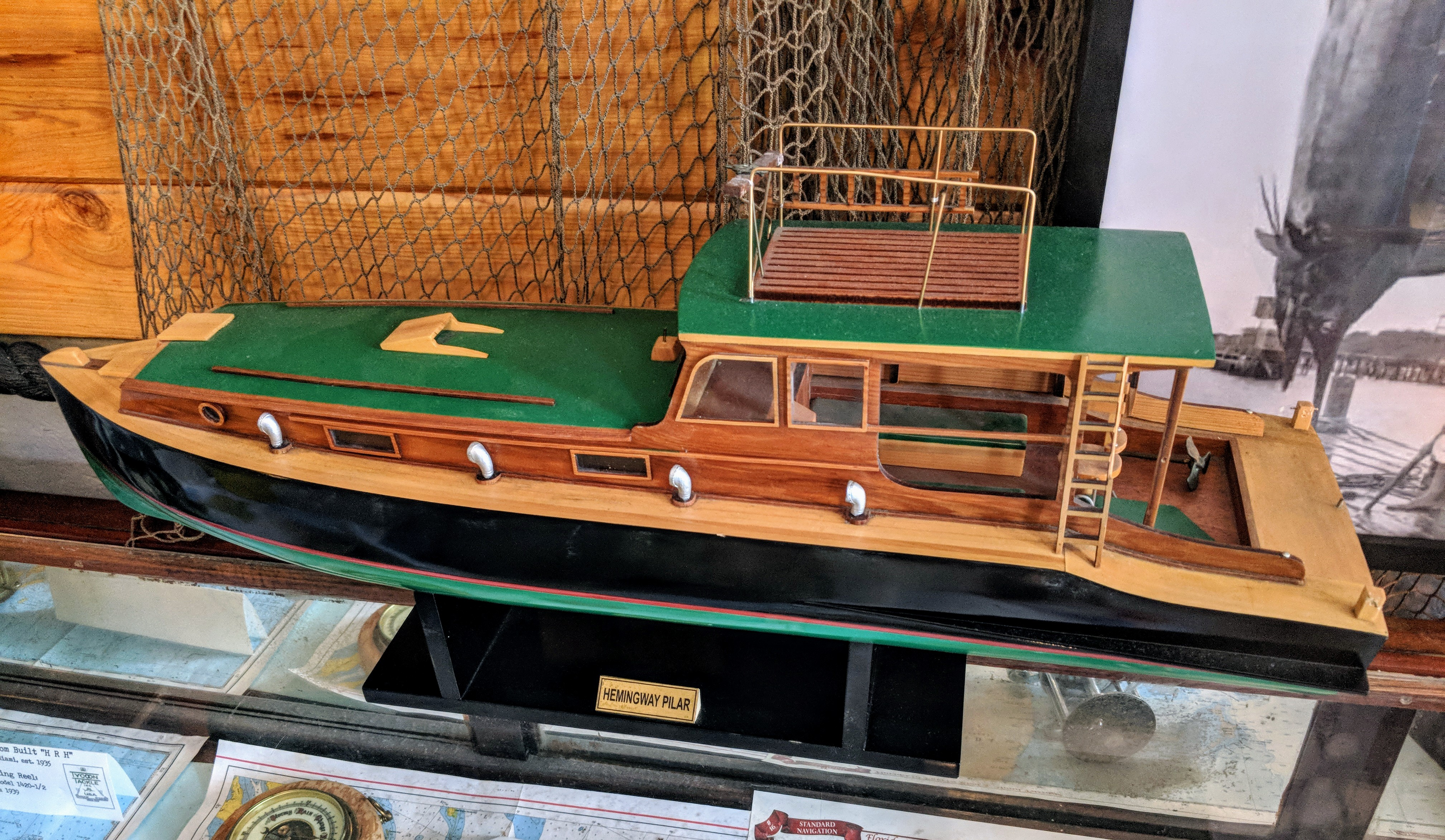
Scale model of Pilar on display at Hemingway's home in Key West

After returning from a safari in Africa, Hemingway acquired the boat on April 18, 1934. The boat was a modified version of the Wheeler Playmate line. The final price for the boat was $7,495, including modifications such as a livewell to contain fish, dual-engine set-up, lowering the boat's transom by twelve inches, and adding a full-width roller on the stern to aid in hauling large fish onto the boat. A flying bridge was added later, but not by Wheeler. In addition, the boat's hull was painted black instead of the stock white color.

The boat was constructed in the Coney Island yard of the Wheeler company, now of Chapel Hill, NC (which also built Fidel Castro's "Granma"), and delivered to Hemingway at Miami, attached to a wooden cradle which was part of the purchase price. With a friend and Wheeler representative, Hemingway sailed the boat under its power from Miami to Key West through Hawk Channel, a semi-protected waterway between the Key islands and the barrier reefs from Biscayne National Park to Key West.

== Science on the boat ==
In addition to hunting, Hemingway was an avid fisherman and a great contributor to the development of the sport. He also contributed to the knowledge of Atlantic marine life. During his first visit to Cuba with Pilar, Hemingway hosted Charles Cadwalader, director of the Academy of Natural Sciences of Philadelphia, and Henry Fowler, the academy's chief ichthyologist. These two scientists were in Cuba trying to determine the taxonomy of marlin species. They attempted to determine if white, blue, black, or striped marlins were different species or just color variants of the same species. As a result of their efforts on the boat, they reclassified the North Atlantic marlin variants.

== U-boat patrols ==
During World War II, Hemingway used his boat to search for German U-boats in the Caribbean waters. Pilar was outfitted with communications gear, including HF/DF or "Huff-Duff" direction-finding equipment. His minimal armament included a Thompson submachine gun and grenades. Most accounts state that any effort to attack a submarine would have been futile. Hemingway wrote about his intent to attack if he spotted a sub. Other accounts of these patrols imply that they were a farce and that he did them in return for extra gas rations and immunity from Cuban police for driving drunk. His hunting for U-Boats inspired the third act, "At Sea," in his novel Islands in the Stream.

== Bimini trips ==
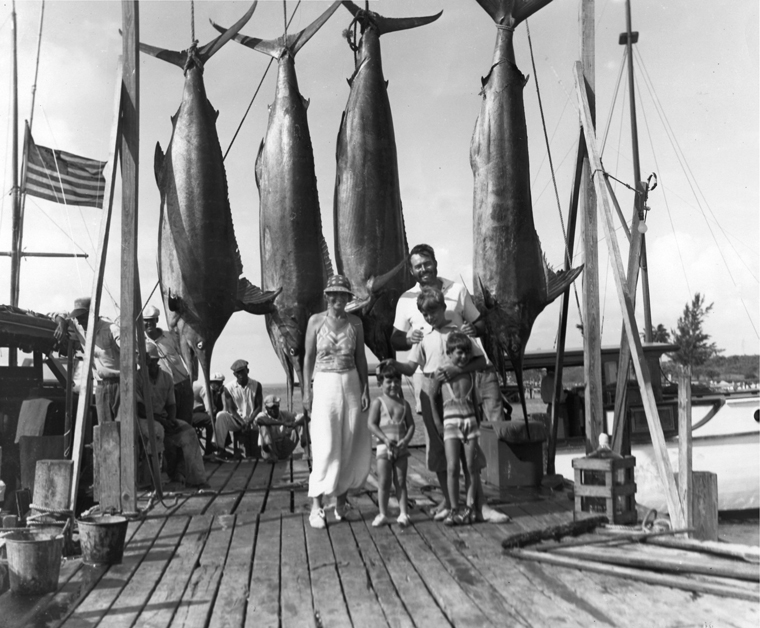
Ernest Hemingway with his wife and children, Bimini, 1935

Hemingway spent three summers in Bimini, starting with the first voyage in April 1935. During the initial attempt at the crossing, he accidentally shot himself in the leg while attempting to boat a shark he caught. On a subsequent trip, he fished with Bror von Blixen-Finecke, with whom he had been on a safari and whose former wife was Karen Blixen, author of Out of Africa. In addition, there are ties to him and Hemingway through Hemingway's books Green Hills of Africa and Under Kilimanjaro.

During the Bimini trips, Hemingway perfected fishing techniques for tuna. He was the first person to land a giant tuna unmutilated. Known as "apple-coring," it had been expected for sharks to attack fish as they tired and were near the boat. His technique involved applying constant pressure to the fish. Where previous methods allowed the fish to run to tire it, he would attempt to boat the fish as soon as possible. He experimented with using a skiff, which he would transfer to, and had the fish pull the boat to weaken it. He also discovered marlins had a defense mechanism in their swords and noses that made them unattractive to sharks but that tuna lacked such a defense.

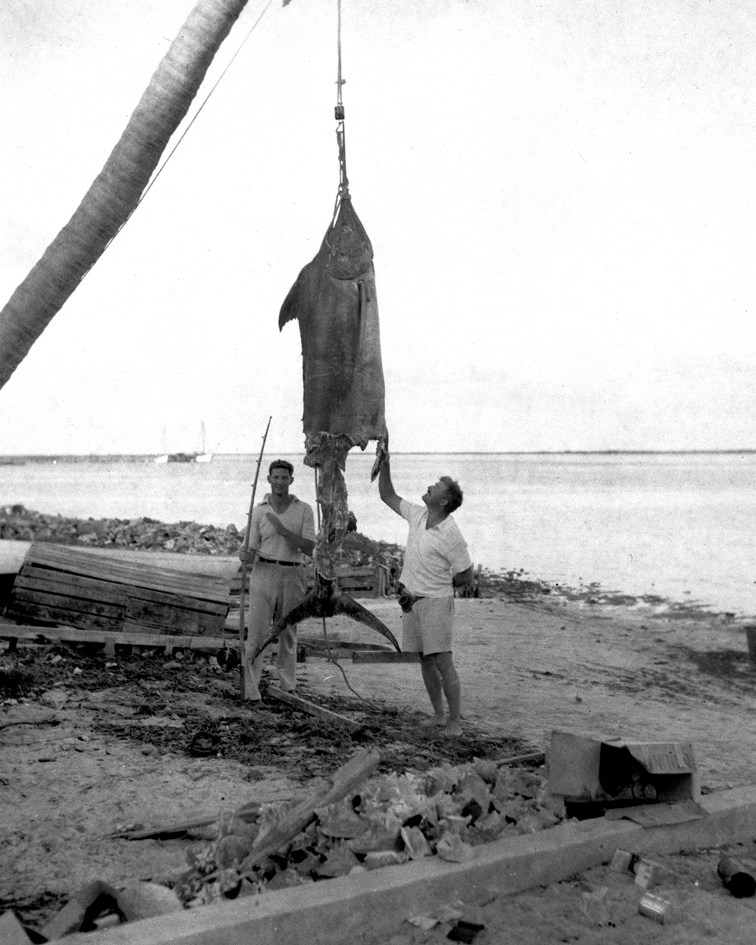
Hemingway and Strater with the remaining 500 lb of marlin

He found that a tuna's primary defense against sharks was speed, and as the fish tire, they became easy targets. He used a Thompson sub-machine gun to shoot at sharks that would appear as the tuna tired and neared the boat.

The photo labelled "Hemingway and Strater with the remaining 500 lb of marlin" shows Hemingway and Henry "Mike" Strater with a half-eaten ("apple-cored") marlin. This fish weighed more than 500 pounds in its half-eaten state. It was projected to be more than 1,000 lb when whole. During the fish landing, Hemingway used a Thompson machine gun to shoot at the sharks and ward them off. Unfortunately, the effect of the shark blood in the water attracted more sharks, which damaged the marlin. Ultimately, the marlin's state somewhat recalls the monster marlin in Hemingway's later masterpiece, The Old Man and the Sea. The incident significantly damaged his relationship with Strater, who believed the use of Hemingway's machine gun against the sharks was the primary reason he lost the most significant fish he had ever caught.

While on Bimini, Hemingway wrote magazine articles for Esquire and worked on his novel, To Have And Have Not. His reputation as a big game angler began to grow. He landed many giant tuna and marlin. He also staged boxing matches with the locals, offering $100 (which ranged upward to $250 based on various accounts) to anyone who could last a few rounds with him. His fighting was not contained to the ring. During a dockside brawl, he punched and knocked out Joe Knapp, a wealthy magazine publisher. Hemingway at first lived in Pilar. He later moved to a cottage near Brown's Dock and eventually, a room at the Compleat Angler Hotel, staying in Room Number 1.

== Fishing ==
Hemingway caught numerous record-breaking fish from Pilar. In 1935, he won every tournament in the Key West-Havana-Bimini triangle, competing against notable sportsmen Michael Lerner and S. Kip Farrington. In 1938, he established a world record by catching seven marlins in one day. He was the first person to boat a giant tuna in an undamaged state. This effort was attributed to him pulling the fish into the boat before it had tired, thereby preventing sharks from eating it. Hemingway kept meticulous fishing logs, including guests, weather, current conditions, fish caught, and other information. During the first summer of owning the boat, an aspiring writer, Arnold Samuelson, served as a deckhand and recorded the dictated logs on paper. He subsequently typed out the logs on display at the John F. Kennedy Presidential Library and Museum. Samuelson later wrote an account of the summer in book form, published posthumously by his daughter.

Named after him, The Hemingway Fishing Tournament has been held in Cuba since 1950. It is a four-day tournament where contestants go for marlin, tuna, wahoo, and other fish using a 50-pound fishing line. Hemingway won the first three years it was held.

== Notable guests ==
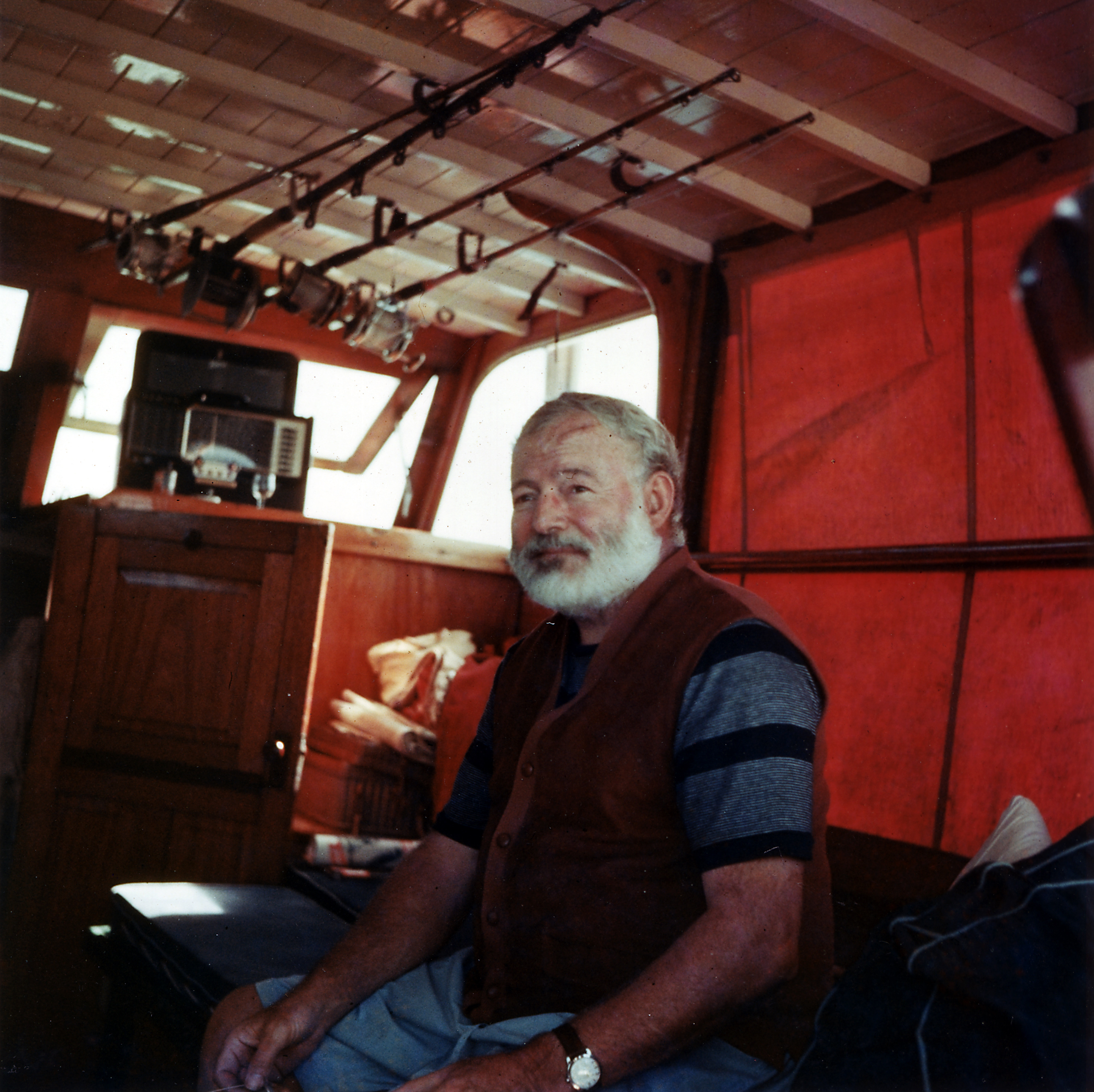
Ernest Hemingway on Pilar

- Archibald MacLeish
- Ava Gardner
- Bror von Blixen-Finecke
- Fidel Castro
- John Dos Passos
- Martha Gellhorn
- Maxwell Perkins
- Sara Murphy
- Sidney Franklin

== Disposition ==
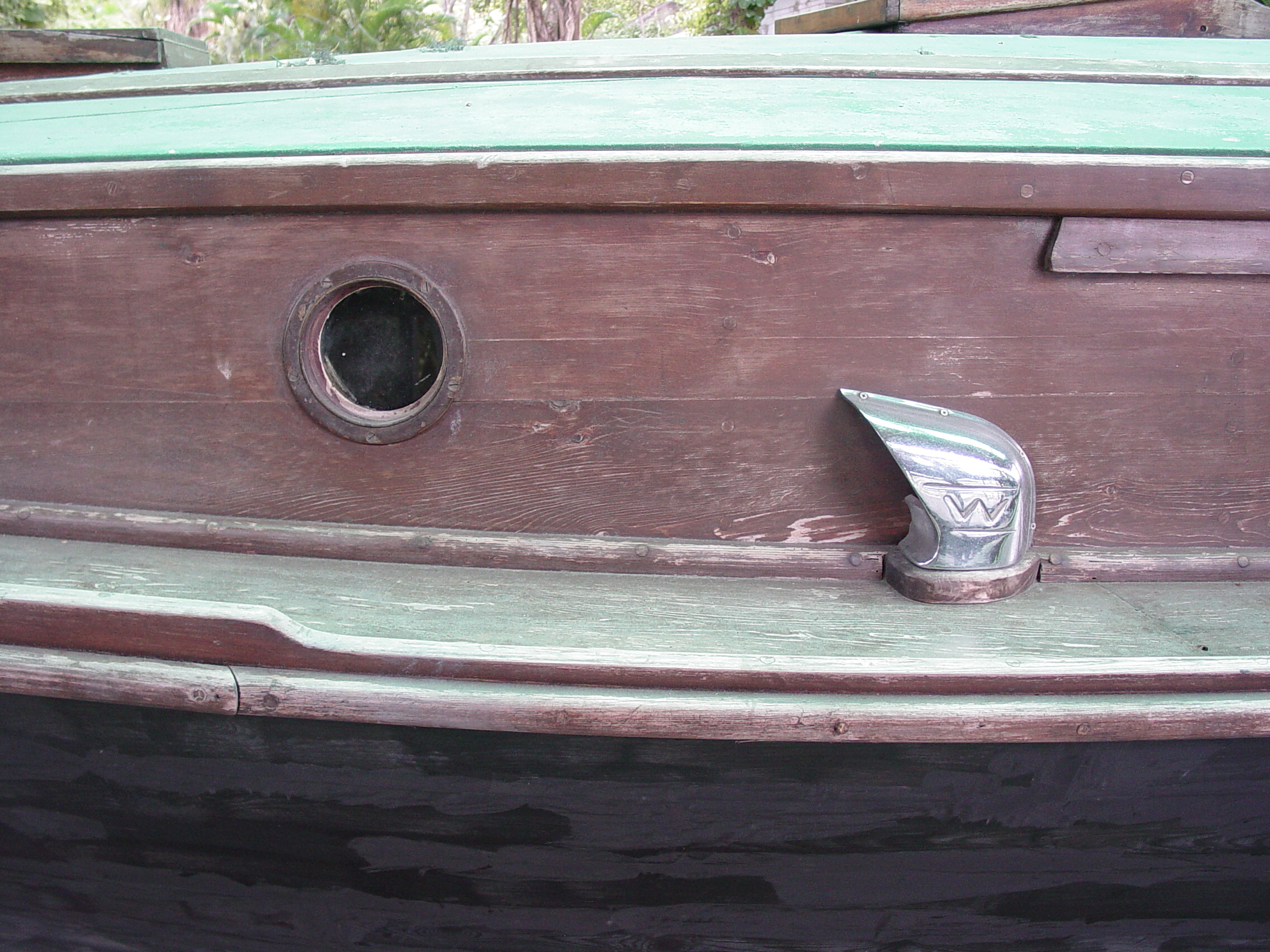
Detailed view of the boat as it appeared in Cuba in 2006; it was subsequently restored

The boat is on display in Cuba at Finca La Vigía, Havana. Hemingway left the boat to his captain, Gregorio Fuentes. Fuentes, one of the hired captains of the boat, is said to have been the basis for the character Santiago from The Old Man and the Sea and Eddy from Islands in the Stream. The Cuban government now owns the boat after Fuentes donated it to the people of Cuba. The sister ship of Pilar is on display in the Bass Pro Shops store in Islamorada, Florida. Hemingway fished from the sister ship, which made him have Pilar commissioned.
