= Riggs-Zorach House =

Historic house in Maine, United States

- U.S. National Register of Historic Places
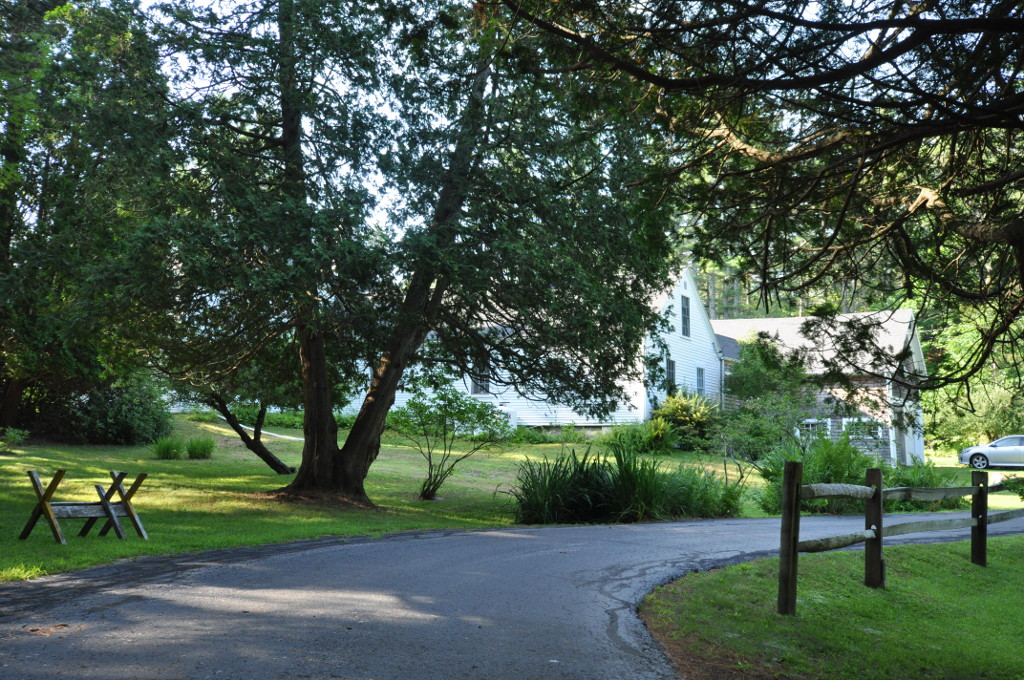

- Location within Maine Location within the United States
- Location: Off Robinhood Rd., Georgetown, Maine
- Coordinates: 43°50′51″N 69°44′11″W
- Area: 22 acres (8.9 ha)
- Architectural style: Federal
- NRHP reference No.: 88003007
- Added to NRHP: December 30, 1988

The Riggs-Zorach House is a historic house in the Robinhood area of Georgetown, Maine. Built in the early 19th century for a local state legislator, it is an excellent local example of Federal/Greek Revival period architecture. It is most prominent as the home of artists Marguerite Thompson Zorach and William Zorach in the mid-20th century. The house was listed on the National Register of Historic Places in 1988.

== Description and history ==
The Riggs-Zorach House stands near the end of Stone Bridge Lane in Robinhood, a hamlet in northeastern Georgetown on the banks of the Sasanoa River. The house is set on 22 acres (8.9 ha) and oriented with a view toward the water. It consists of a 2 1/2-story main block, to which a series of additional structures (ell, carriage barn, and barn) are connected, giving the entire structure a W shape. The main block has a combination of Federal and Greek Revival features, with narrow Federal period molding around its windows, and a Greek Revival entrance surround. The building is covered by gabled roofs, with clapboard siding and a granite foundation. The interior has Federal period wood paneling and detailing on its main staircase.

The house was built sometime in the first three decades of the 19th century by James Riggs, the son of Benjamin Riggs, who came to the area in the 1770s. The younger Riggs was a merchant who also served one term as a state legislator. The house remained in the Riggs family roughly through the end of the 19th century, and was abandoned for about 20 years. In 1923, it was purchased by William and Marguerite Zorach. William was a Lithuanian immigrant and sculptor, whose works, as well as those of his wife, a prominent Fauve and post-modernist painter and textiles artist, have been displayed in major American museums. The house served as the Zorachs' summer studio until his death in 1966.

== See also ==
- National Register of Historic Places listings in Sagadahoc County, Maine
