= Gregorio Fuentes =

Cuban fisherman and Ernest Hemingway's first mate

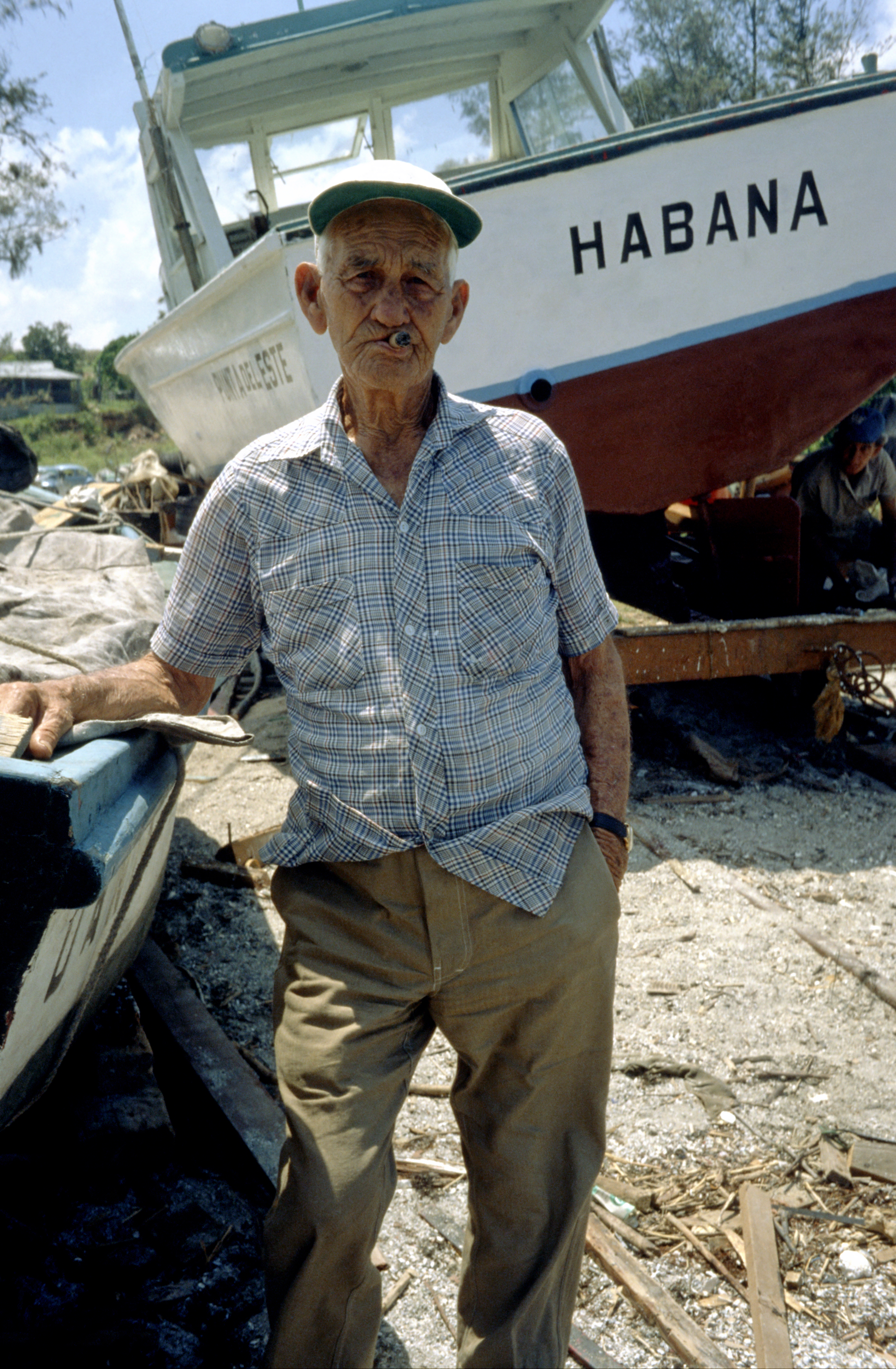
Gregorio Fuentes in Cojimar in 1993

Gregorio Fuentes (July 11, 1897 – January 13, 2002) was a fisherman and the first mate of the Pilar, the boat belonging to the American writer Ernest Hemingway.

Fuentes was born in Arrecife on Lanzarote in the Canary Islands. He first went to sea as deck boy with his father at age 10. As a teenager, he worked on cargo ships out of the Canary Islands to Trinidad and Puerto Rico, and from the Spanish ports of Valencia and Sevilla to South America. He migrated permanently to Cuba when he was 22. He attempted to reclaim his Spanish citizenship in 2001.

In 1938, Fuentes replaced the Pilar's original first mate, Carlos Gutiérrez, after Hemingway's mistress, Jane Mason, hired him to be the first mate of her boat after becoming jealous of Hemingway's relationship with Martha Gellhorn.

Fuentes, a lifelong cigar smoker, died from cancer in Cojimar in 2002. He was often said to be the model for the character Santiago in Hemingway’s The Old Man and the Sea, but he died without having read the book. He was 104 years old.

== The Old Man and the Sea ==
Fuentes is credited by some as a model for Hemingway's protagonist Santiago in The Old Man and the Sea, though this is most likely the result of Fuentes' longevity and how he purposefully grew into the incarnation of the role of Santiago for tourists visiting Cojimar. Hemingway himself stated that Santiago was "based on no one in particular".

That Fuentes worked closely with and knew Hemingway very well is undeniable. However, if anyone can claim credit for being the inspiration for Santiago, it was Hemingway's original first mate, Carlos Gutiérrez. Gutiérrez had been fishing the Gulf Stream for 40 years and was already an old man when Hemingway first met him. Hemingway would credit the old fisherman with teaching him everything he knew about catching marlin, and credited Gutiérrez with telling him the Cuban tales he used as grist to write On The Blue Water: A Gulf Stream Letter.

Additionally, Hemingway laid out the plot outline for ''The Old Man And The Sea'' and how Gutiérrez's assistance proved vital to the story's creation and evolution in a letter written in February 1939 to his editor, Max Perkins:

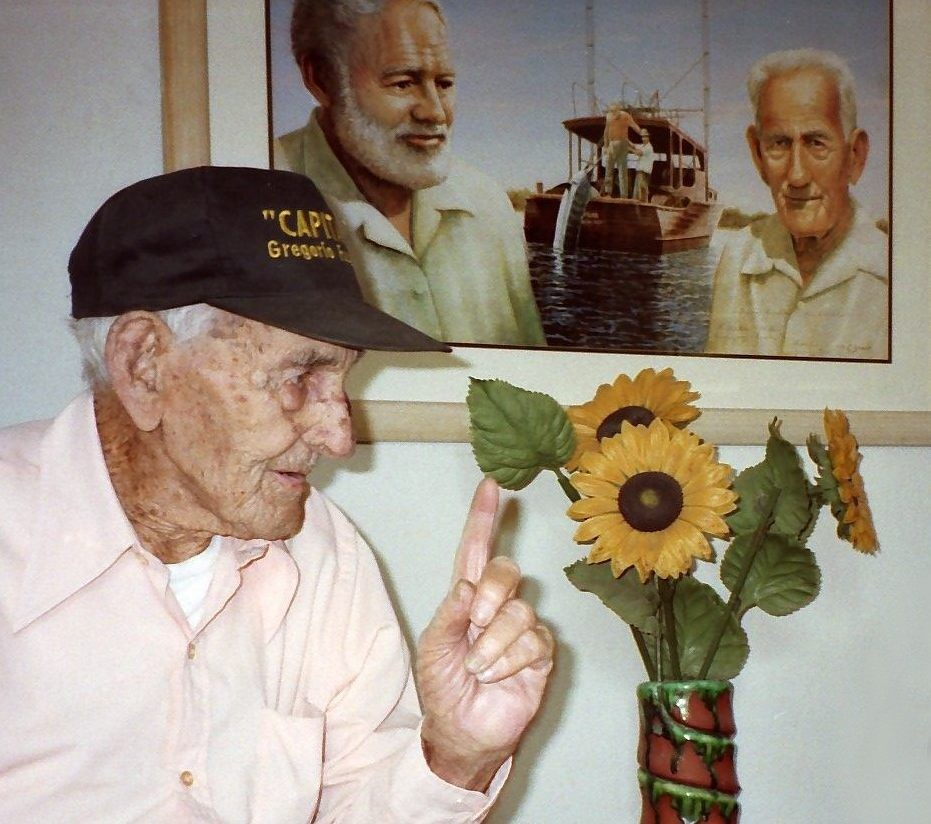
Gregorio Fuentes at 100

One [story] about the old commercial fisherman who fought the swordfish all alone in his skiff for 4 days and four nights and the sharks finally eating it after he had it alongside and could not get into the boat. That's a wonderful story of the Cuban coast. I'm going out with old Carlos in his skiff so as to get it all right. Everything he does and everything he thinks in all that long fight with the boat out of sight of all the other boats all alone on the sea. It's a great story if I can get it right. One that would make the book.

Fuentes would spend his later years charging tourists $10 or $20 to take his picture and regale them with stories of his domestic partnership with Ernest Hemingway.

== Sources ==
- Hemingway In Cuba by Hilary Hemingway and Carlene Brennan, June 2003
- Welcome to Havana, Señor Hemingway by Alfredo Jose Estrada, August 2005
- How it Was by Mary Welsh Hemingway, 1977.
