= Henry Strater =

American painter and illustrator (1896–1987)

- Born: January 21, 1896; Louisville, Kentucky, U.S.
- Died: December 21, 1987 (aged 91); Palm Beach, Florida, U.S.
- Other name: Mike Strater
- Education: Princeton University, Art Students League of New York, Pennsylvania Academy of the Fine Arts, Académie de la Grande Chaumière
- Occupations: Painter, illustrator

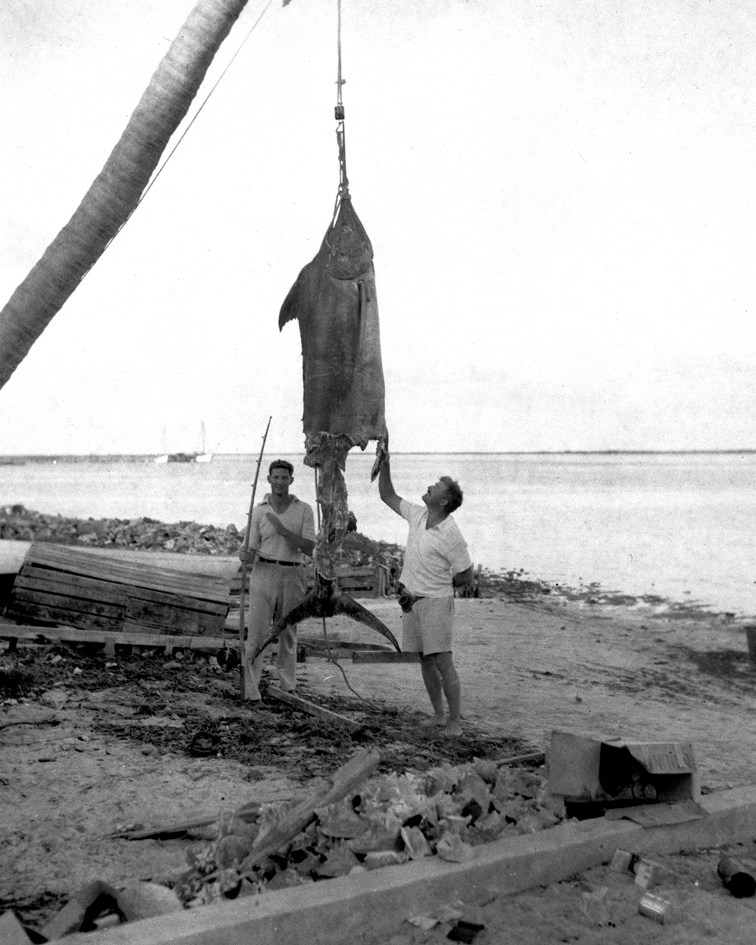
Ernest Hemingway and Henry Strater (1935), Cat Cay, Bahamas

Henry "Mike" Strater (January 21, 1896 – December 21, 1987) was an American painter and illustrator. He was a friend of Ernest Hemingway and other figures of the Lost Generation. He was best known for his portraiture, figurative, and landscape drawings and paintings. Strater founded the Ogunquit Museum of American Art in Ogunquit, Maine which hosted its first exhibition in 1953.

== Early life and education ==
Henry Strater was born on January 21, 1896, in Louisville, Kentucky. He later attended Princeton University, during which he befriended F. Scott Fitzgerald. Strater was Fitzgerald's inspiration for the character "Burne Halliday" from the novel This Side of Paradise (1920).

During 1917 and World War I, Strater enlisted in the French Red Cross and drove ambulances for the Allies. In 1919 he returned to the United States to studied at the Art Students League of New York and Pennsylvania Academy of the Fine Arts. He also took some classes at Real Academia de Bellas Artes de San Fernando in Madrid.

In the 1920s, Strater studied at the Académie de la Grande Chaumière in the Montparnasse district of Paris, under Edouard Vuillard. While in Paris, Strater met Hemingway in a bar, where they had a brawl. Later they became friends and Strater painted two portraits of Hemingway in late 1922 while still in Paris.

== Career ==
Ezra Pound had Strater illustrate part of the book, The Cantos.

His friendship with Hemingway ended in 1935, over a Time magazine photo of Marlin fishing that incorrectly credited Hemingway with catching Strater's oversized fish. Hemingway did not correct the issue.

In either 1952 or 1953, Strater founded the Ogunquit Museum of American Art in Ogunquit, Maine.

== Death and legacy ==
He died at the age of 91 on December 21, 1987, in Palm Beach. He is buried at the First Parish Cemetery in York, Maine.

Strater's work can be found in museums including the Ogunquit Museum of American Art, Chrysler Museum of Art, Harvard Art Museums, the Art Institute of Chicago, the Detroit Institute of Arts, and the Princeton University Art Museum.
