= Bernard Karfiol =

American painter (1886–1952)

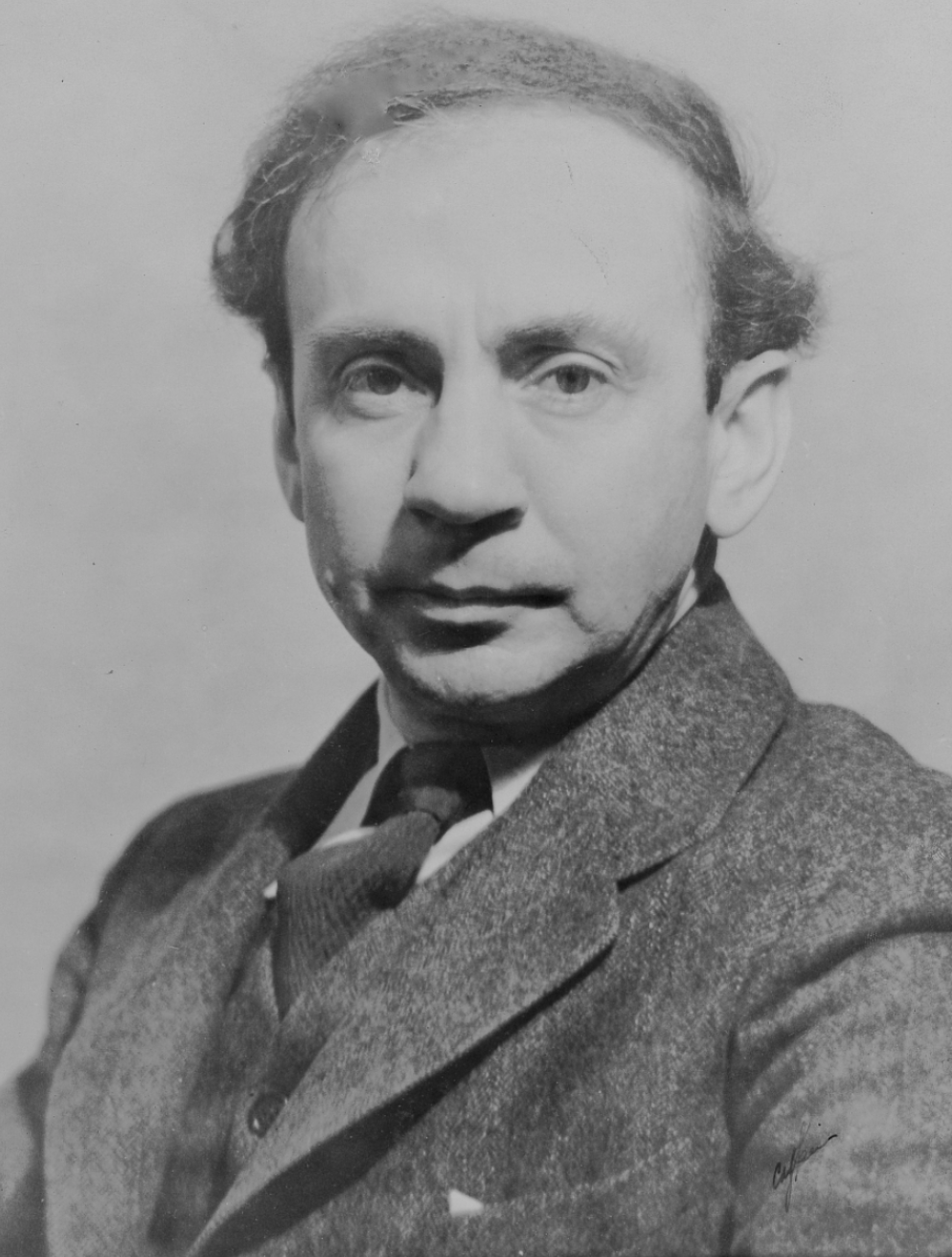
- Bernard Karfiol, c. 1930
- Born: May 6, 1886; Budapest, Hungary
- Died: August 16, 1952; Irvington, New York, U.S.
- Education: National Academy of Design
- Known for: Painting
- Movement: Modernism

Bernard Karfiol (May 6, 1886 – August 16, 1952) was an American painter and watercolorist. His work was indebted to French modernism and wished to synthesize Hellenic classical painting and modernist abstract concerns.

== Biography ==
Bernard Karfiol was born in Budapest, Hungary (where his parents, residents of Boston, were then travelling), but grew up in Brooklyn. Before the age of fifteen he attended the Pratt Institute and was awarded a scholarship to study at the National Academy of Design.

In 1902, he left for Paris where he attended Jean-Paul Laurens classes at the Académie Julian and the École des Beaux-Arts while discovering the artistic trends of the time. André Derain is a notable example, while Renoir, Cézanne and Picasso’s early manner also contributed to his artistic formation. In 1904, he participated in the Paris Salon d’Automne.

He then traveled through England and the rest of Europe; upon his return to Paris he met Henri Matisse and Henri Rousseau at Gertrude and Leo Stein’s.

In 1906, he was back in New York City, working as a teacher in the studio provided by his friend, sculptor Gertrude Vanderbilt Whitney. He also joined the Ridgefield Artists Colony. Connoisseur and art collector Hamilton Easter Field noticed his work at the Armory Show in New York in 1913. Field bought some of his paintings and invited him to teach at the school he had just opened in the coastal village of Ogunquit, Maine. Field organized his first major exhibition in 1917, it was followed by three solo exhibitions of his work at the Brummer Gallery (New York); he was later represented by Edith Gregor Halpert’s Downtown Gallery and participated in several exhibitions organized by the Museum of Modern Art.

When Seated Figure was exhibited in 1925–26 at the First Pan-American Exhibition of Oil Paintings in Los Angeles, it was awarded an honorable mention. In 1927, Karfiol took part in the 26th International Exhibition of the Carnegie Institute in Pittsburgh, Pennsylvania and won an honorable mention in the Carnegie Prize. In 1928, he won the gold medal at the Corcoran.

Karfiol is a figurative painter influenced by Impressionism and Post-Impressionism and known for his tenderness towards his subjects, sensual forms and a soft palette of roses, oranges and dusty blues. He painted portraits of children, nudes, landscapes and marines. His later travels to Cuba, Jamaica and Mexico in the 1930s inspired new subjects with stronger and more intense colors. Karfiol died in Irvington, New York.

In addition to the MoMa, his works can be found in the collections of the Pennsylvania Academy of the Fine Arts, the Metropolitan Museum of Art, the Los Angeles County Museum of Art, the Smithsonian American Art Museum, the Phillips Collection, the Whitney Museum of American Art, and the National Gallery of Art or the Brooklyn Museum.

== Bibliography ==
- Salpeter, Harry (March 1937). "Pure Painter: Bernard Karfiol". Esquire.
