= William Zorach =

American sculptor

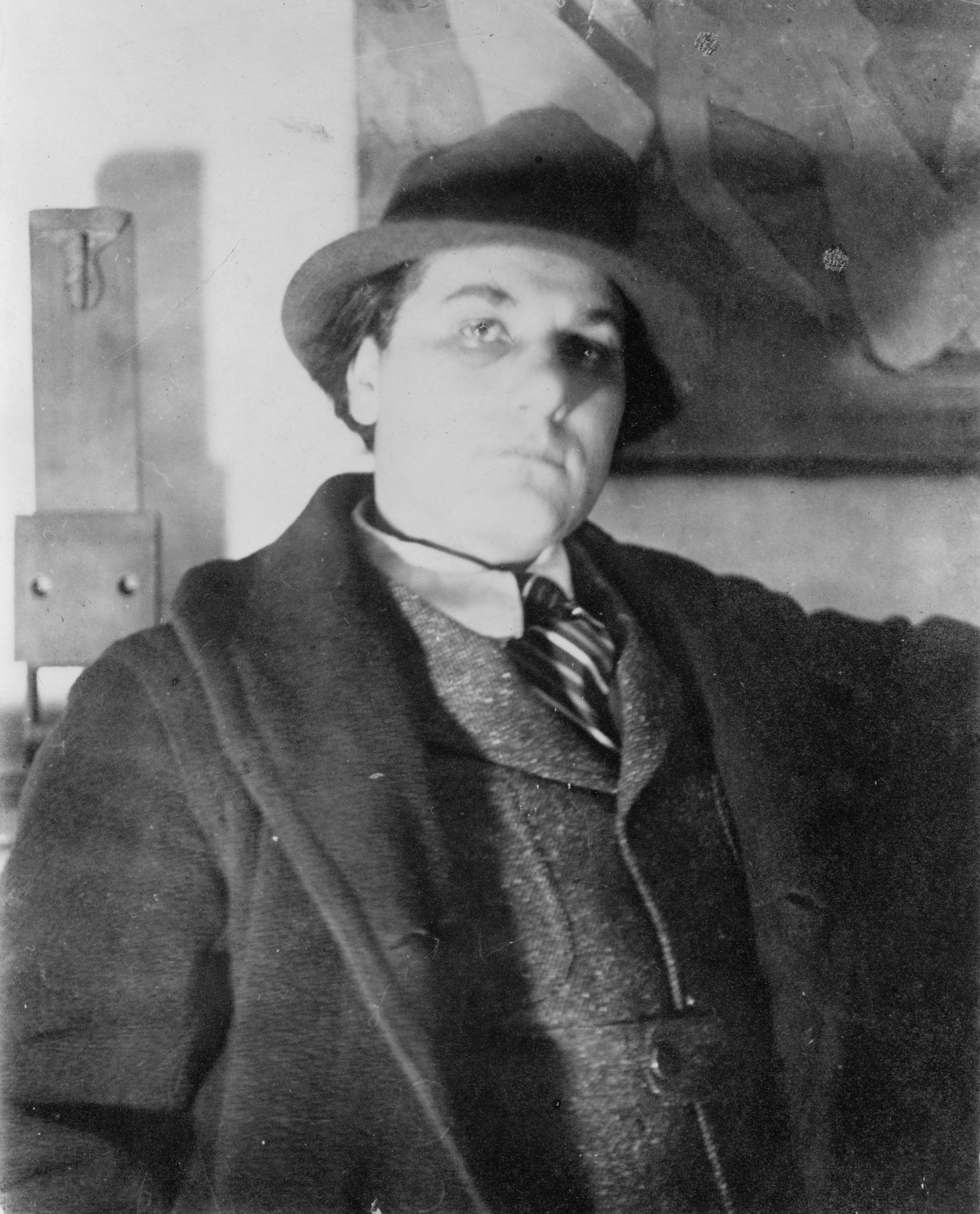
- William Zorach circa 1917, photographed by Man Ray
- Born: Zorach Gorfinkel; February 28, 1889; Jurbarkas, Lithuania, Russian Empire
- Died: November 15, 1966 (aged 77); Bath, Maine, U.S.
- Known for: Sculpture, painting, printmaking
- Spouse: Marguerite Zorach (m. 1912)
- Elected: American Academy of Arts and Letters (1953)

William Zorach (February 28, 1889 – November 15, 1966) was an American sculptor, painter, printmaker, and writer. He won the Logan Medal of the Arts in 1927. He was at the forefront of American artists embracing cubism.

He was the husband of Marguerite Thompson Zorach and father of Dahlov Ipcar, both artists in their own right. He also had a son, Tessim Zorach, who was a supporter of the arts.

== Early life ==
Zorach Gorfinkel was born in 1889 into a Lithuanian Jewish family, the son of a barge owner, in Jurbarkas (Russian: Eurburg) in Lithuania (then a part of the Russian Empire). As the eighth of ten children, Zorach (then his given name) emigrated with his family to the United States in 1894. They settled in Cleveland, Ohio under the name "Finkelstein". In school, his first name was changed to "William" by a teacher. Zorach stayed in Ohio for almost 15 years pursuing his artistic endeavors. He apprenticed with a lithographer as a teenager and went on to study painting with Henry G. Keller in night school at the Cleveland School of Art from 1905 to 1907. In 1908, Zorach moved to New York in enroll in the National Academy of Design. In 1910, Zorach moved to Paris with Cleveland artist and lithographer, Elmer Brubeck, to continue his artistic training at the La Palette art school.

== Career ==
While in Paris, Zorach met Marguerite Thompson (1887–1968), an art student and fellow American, whom he married on December 24, 1912, in New York City. The couple adopted his original given name, Zorach, as a common surname. Zorach and his wife returned to America where they continued to experiment with different media. In 1913, works by both Zorach and Marguerite, were included in the now famous Armory Show, introducing his work to the general public as well as art critics and collectors. Both William and Marguerite were heavily influenced by cubism and fauvism. They are credited as being among the premier artists to introduce European styles to American modernism. During the next seven years, Zorach established himself as a painter, frequently displaying his paintings in gallery shows as venues such as the Society of Independent Artists and the Whitney Studio Club. While Marguerite began to experiment with textiles and created large, fine art tapestries and hooked rugs, William began to experiment with sculpture, which would become his primary medium.

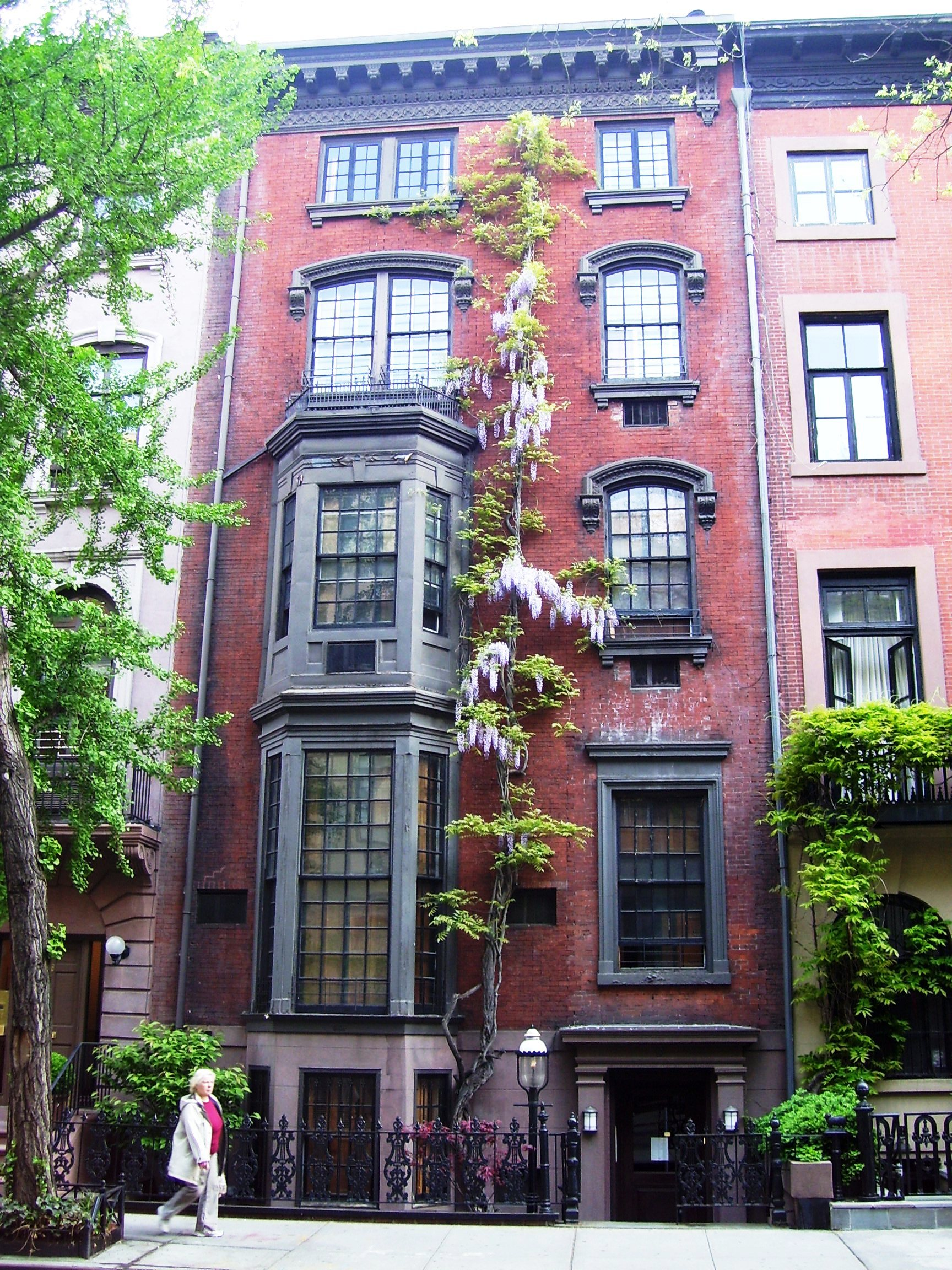
17 West 9th Street, New York City house

In 1915, William and Marguerite started their family with the birth of their son, Tessim. Their daughter, Dahlov Ipcar, was born in 1917, and would later also work as an artist. While the Zorach family spent their winters in New York, their summers were divided between New Hampshire and Massachusetts. Notably, they spent a few summers in Plainfield, New Hampshire at the Cornish Art Colony, renting Echo Farm which was owned by their friend and fellow artist Henry Fitch Taylor. It was here that their daughter was born, all the while producing various prints depicting country life. He was also a member of the Provincetown Printers art colony in Massachusetts.

In 1923, the Zorach family purchased a farm on Georgetown Island, Maine where they resided, worked, and entertained guests. Zorach was elected to the American Academy of Arts and Letters in 1953.

== Works ==
Zorach's works can be found in numerous private, corporate, and public collections across the country including such acclaimed locales as the Smithsonian American Art Museum, the Museum of Fine Arts, Boston, the Metropolitan Museum of Art, the Whitney Museum of Art, the National Gallery of Art, Radio City Music Hall, the Currier Museum of Art, Joslyn Art Museum, and the Ogunquit Museum of American Art, as well as numerous college and university collections. His work was also part of the sculpture event in the art competition at the 1932 Summer Olympics.

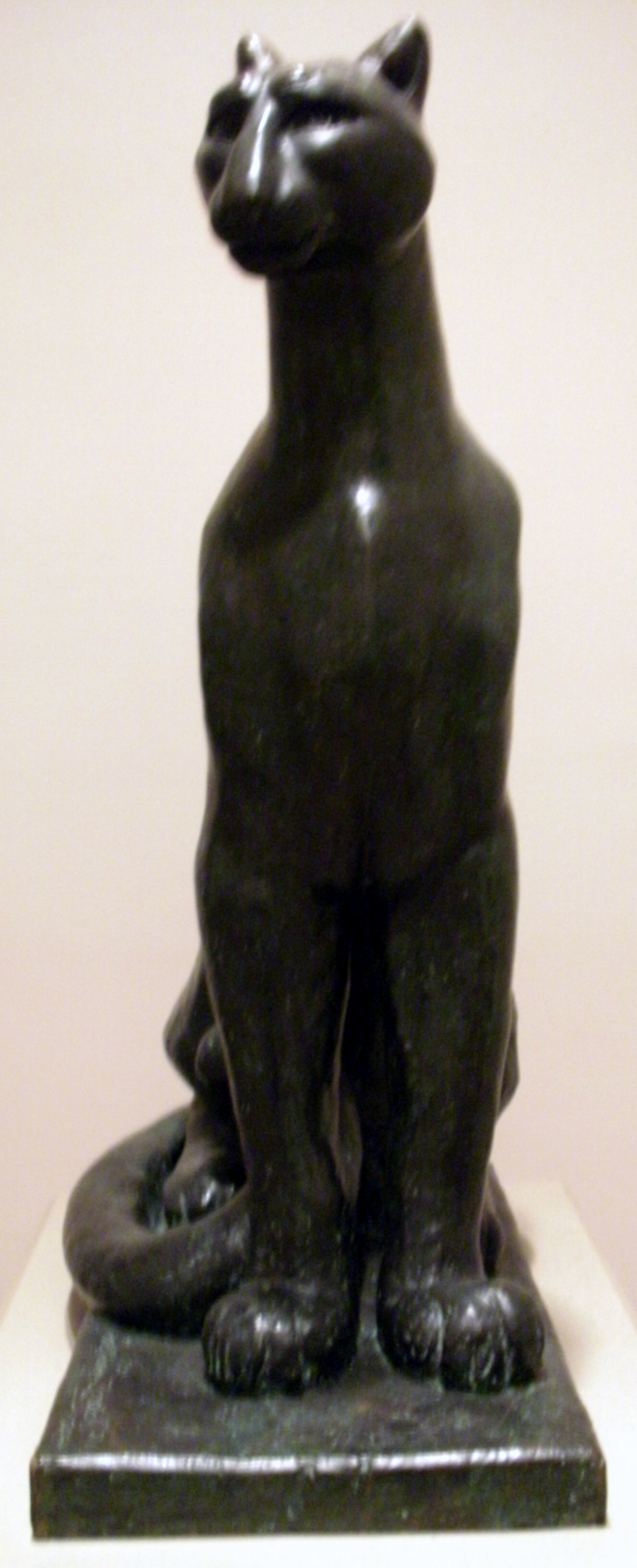
Puma, in the National Gallery of Art

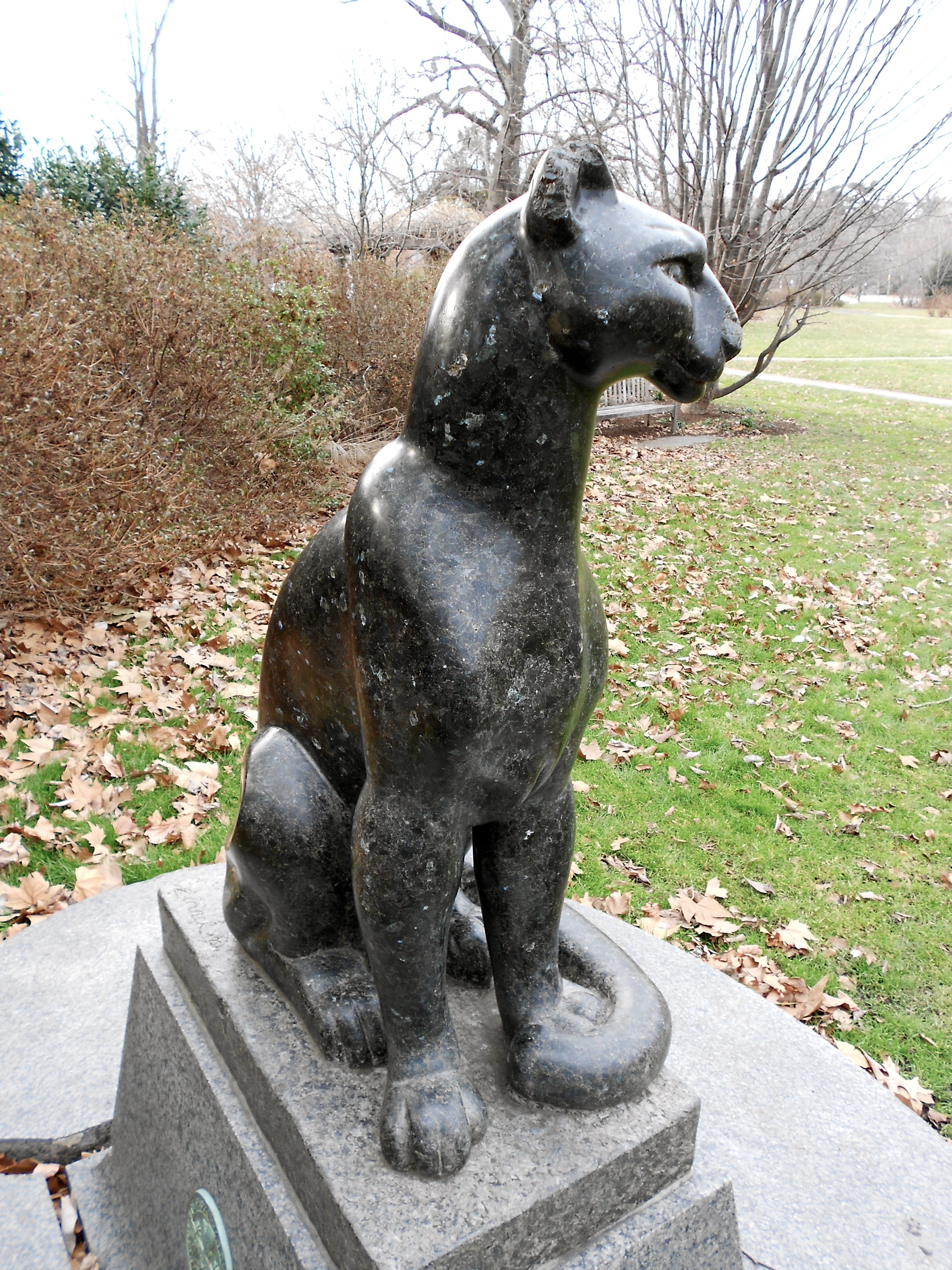
Puma

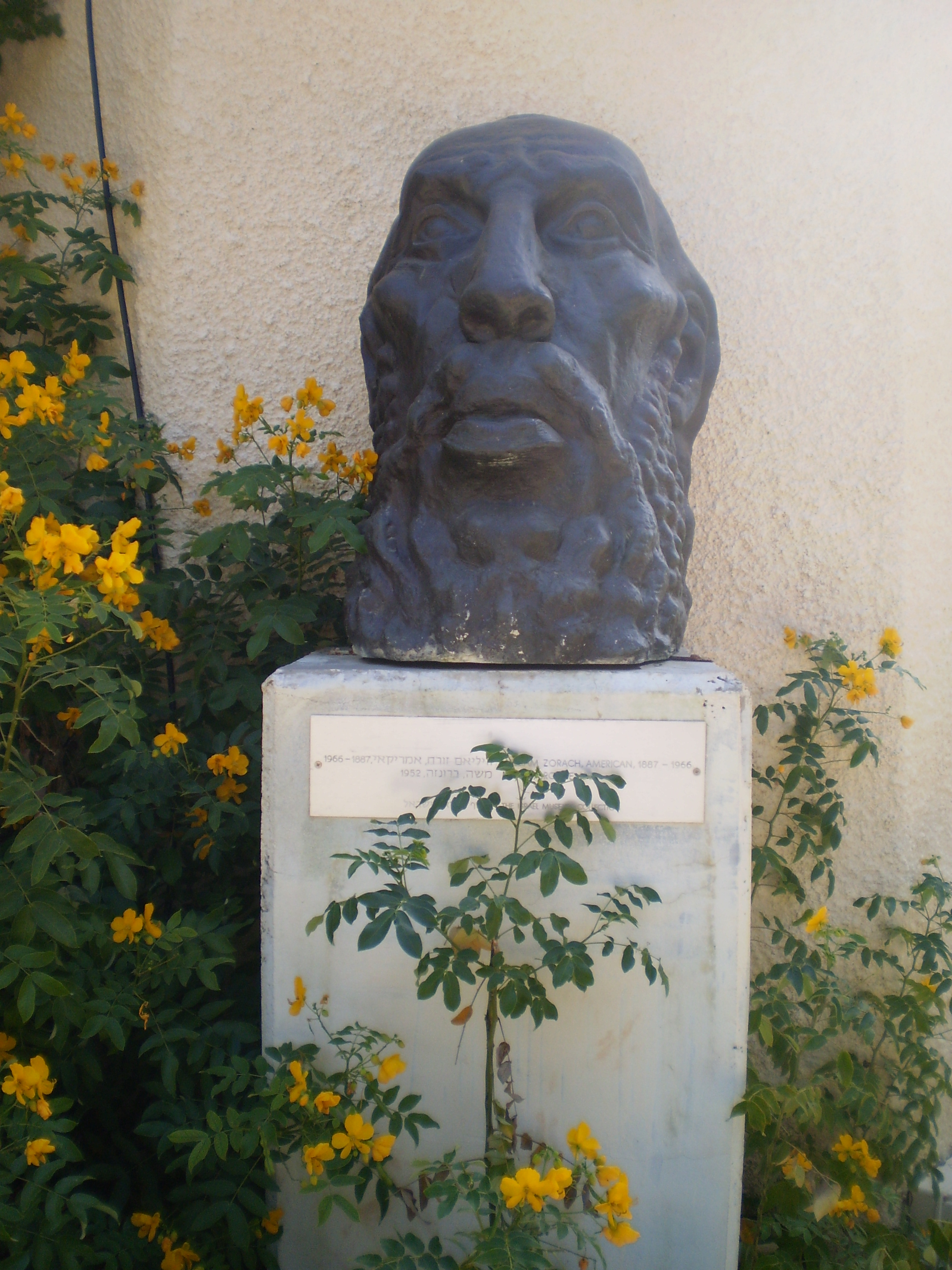
Moses

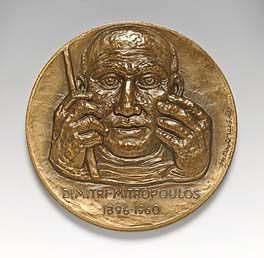
Dimitri Mitropoulos, International Music Competition Medal

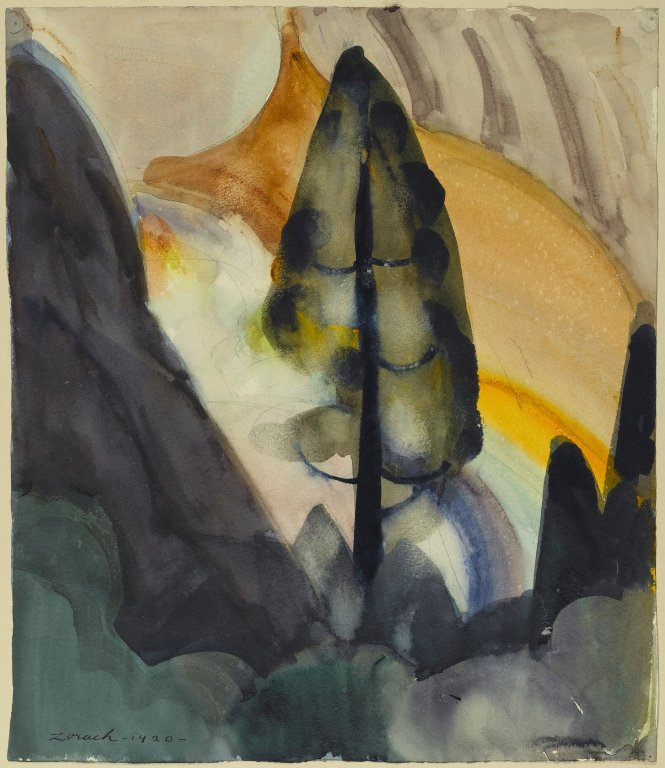
Brooklyn Museum - Tree - Yosemite - William Zorach - overall

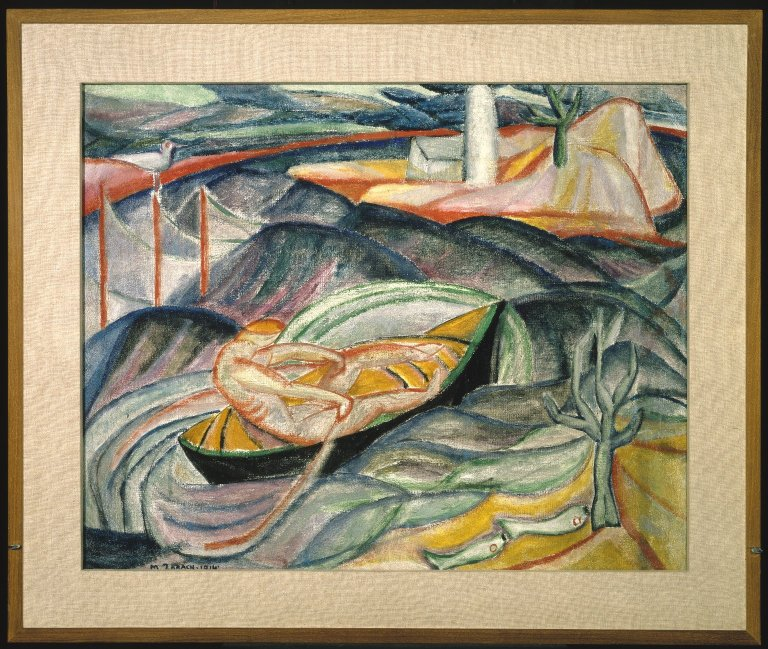
Brooklyn Museum - Skiff in Waves (recto) and Figures in Landscape (verso) - Marguerite Thompson Zorach - framed

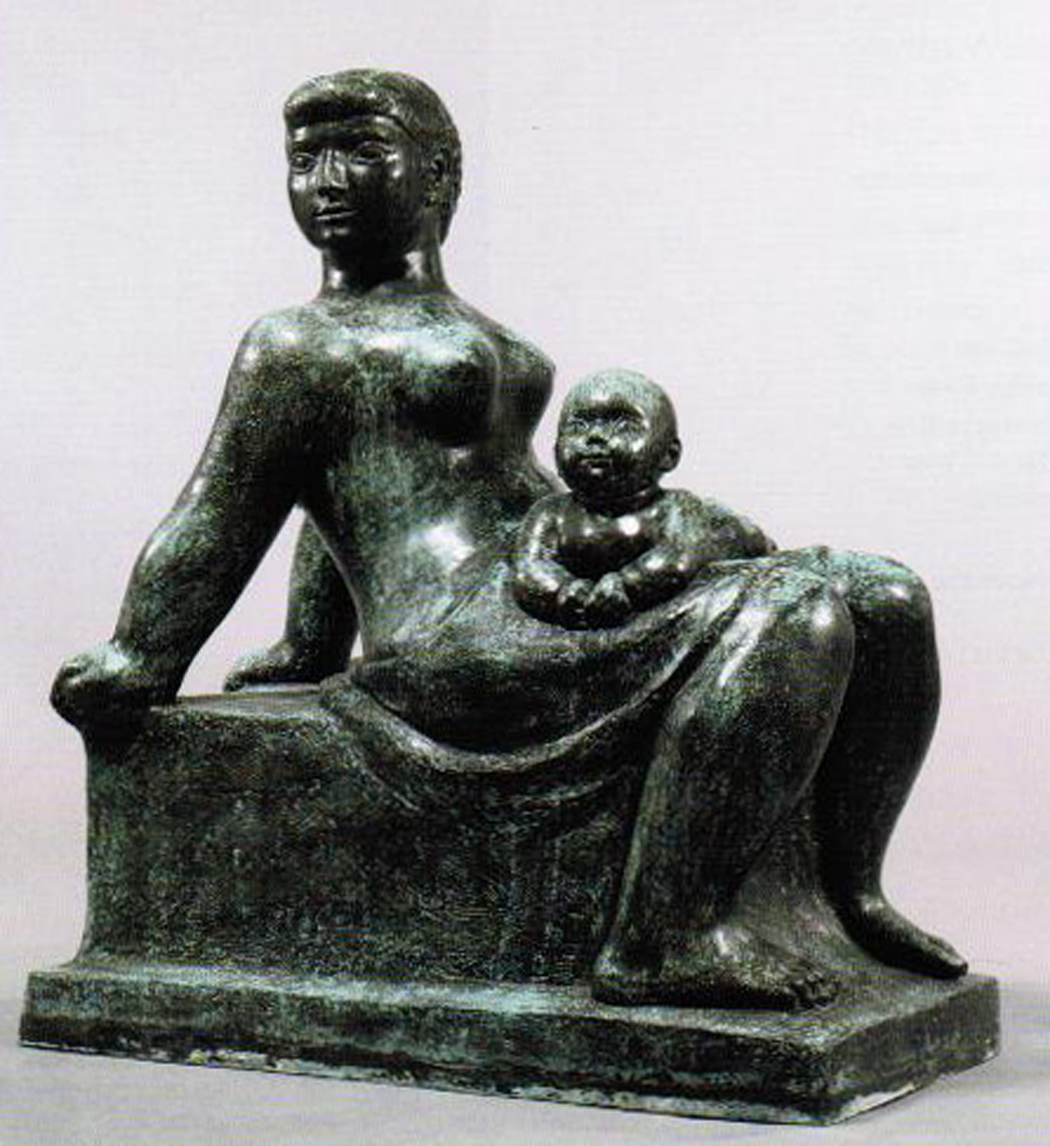
New Horizons. Bronze sculpture, 1951, approximately 42 inches high.

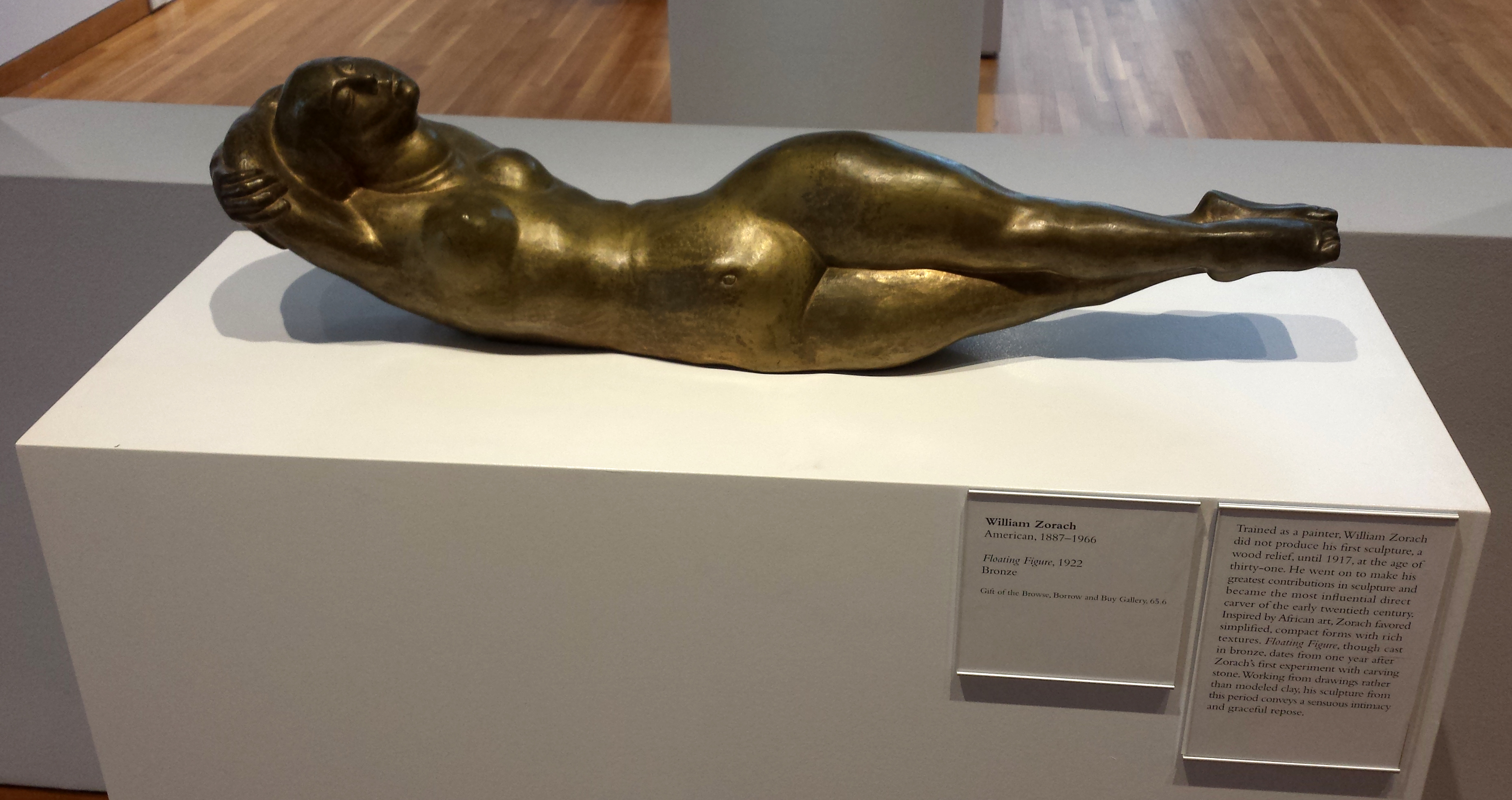
William Zorach, Floating Figure. 1922. Bronze. High Museum of Art, Atlanta, Georgia.

New York Harbor (1923), The Phillips Collection
