= St. Peter's By-The-Sea Protestant Episcopal Church (Cape Neddick, Maine) =

Historic church in Maine, United States

- U.S. National Register of Historic Places
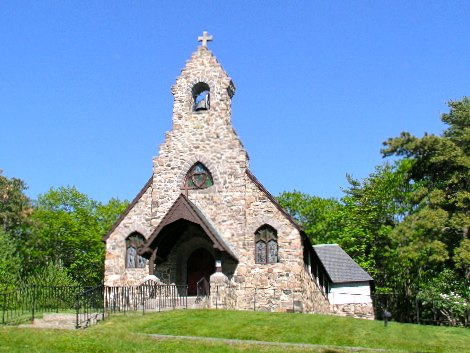

- Location within Maine Location within the United States
- Nearest city: Cape Neddick, Maine
- Coordinates: 43°13′4″N 70°35′3″W
- Area: 0.3 acres (0.12 ha)
- Built: 1897
- Architect: Burns, Charles M.
- Architectural style: Gothic Revival
- NRHP reference No.: 99000773
- Added to NRHP: July 1, 1999

St. Peter's By-The-Sea Protestant Episcopal Church is a historic church at 529 Shore Road in York County, Maine, approximately 1 mile north of the village of Cape Neddick. Built in 1897, it is an example of Gothic Revival architecture, and is one of several architecturally distinguished summer resort chapels that dot the Maine coast. It was listed on the National Register of Historic Places in 1999. It is used for services between June and September.

== Description ==
The church is set on the east side of Shore Drive, just south of The Cliff House Resort, between the communities of Cape Neddick and Ogunquit on the York County coast. It is a stone and wood construction, built in the style of a medieval English country church. It is roughly cruciform in shape, with short transepts and an entry porch. The stone tower rises in buttress-like steps to an open belfry, and is capped by a stone cross. The interior has Gothic style timber truss framing, tongue-and-groove paneled walls and ceilings, and Gothic-style lights.

== History ==
Nanne Dunlap Conarroe made a bequest in 1897 to build the church and the Ogunquit Memorial Library. In accordance with her deceased husband George's wishes, the church was built on Christian Hill, so that the cross on the steeple could be viewed by fishermen at sea. The church and the library were both designed by Charles C. Burns, and built by Edward Blaisdell of York. A house, originally named Bonnie Brae but now known as the Marmion House, was built adjacent to the church in 1900, and has served as the rectory since 1908. In 1917 Nanne Conarroe died and left the church, Bonnie Brae, and two other houses, to the board of directors. The church was incorporated in 1927. In 2007, a memorial garden was opened adjacent to the church for the burial of cremains.

== See also ==
- Ogunquit Memorial Library
- National Register of Historic Places listings in York County, Maine
