= Arnie Ginsburg =

American disc jockey (1926–2020)

- Born: Arnold William Ginsburg; August 5, 1926; Brookline, Massachusetts, U.S.
- Died: June 26, 2020 (aged 93); Ogunquit, Maine, U.S.
- Occupations: Radio disc jockey, business manager, program manager

Arnold William Ginsburg (August 5, 1926 – June 26, 2020), known as Arnie "Woo-Woo" Ginsburg, was an American disc jockey in the Boston radio market from the mid-1950s to the 1970s. Following this period, he became involved in the business side of radio as a business manager, president and owner of WVJV-TV 66 and later as an executive with Pyramid Broadcasting and program manager of their Boston station WXKS (1430 AM).

== Early years ==
Arnold William Ginsburg was born on August 5, 1926. He was raised in Brookline, Massachusetts, the son of Paul Ginsburg, who ran a millinery company, and Sophia (Charak) Ginsburg, who had been a singer prior to marriage. His family was of Russian Jewish descent. Arnie graduated from Brookline High School in 1944. His first radio job was at the old WORL (950 AM), where he was an engineer for announcer Alan Dary. He did not intend to be an announcer; but at one point, he sat in on air with Dary and got a good response. Despite not having the traditional deep radio voice, Ginsburg developed an audience that wanted to hear more of him, and he moved to WBOS (1600 AM) in 1956 to be a night-time disc jockey. It was at WBOS, a station that programmed foreign language shows during the daytime, that he developed his own on-air Top 40 show; this prepared him for his move to a full-time Boston Top 40 radio station, WMEX (1510 AM), in 1958.

== Top 40 career ==
While he developed a following during his time with WBOS, it was at WMEX that Ginsburg's popularity as a disc jockey expanded and he remained Boston's top rated night time personality during his WMEX years from the late 1950s to the mid-1960s. He was unusual, and not just because of his high-pitched voice; he jokingly referred to himself as "Old Leather Lungs" or "Old Aching Adenoids", but he was best known as "Woo Woo" Ginsburg, for his use of sound effects: his show was called the Night Train, and he used a train horn. In an era where Top 40 DJs were given non-descript and non-ethnic radio names, Ginsburg kept his birth name and did not change it. He also refused a salary from station owner Max Richmond, instead making a deal for a 25% cut of all the commercial revenue Ginsburg would generate for his show. This, he claimed, made him "the highest-paid jock on the station." According to Billboard magazine, by 1959, he was making an annual salary of $10,000, an amount higher than the median American income at that time. Ginsburg frequently did on-air testimonials for his advertisers, and perhaps the best-known was his work for Adventure Car Hop, a drive-in fast-food restaurant on Route 1 in Saugus, which promoted the "Ginsburger." According to the car-hop's owners, Ginsburg's radio commercials brought as many as two thousand teenagers to his restaurant on a typical summer night.

Ginsburg was also known for his ability to create hits by giving them radio exposure on his show. One good example was a novelty song sung by British vocalist Lonnie Donegan, "Does Your Chewing Gum Lose Its Flavour (On the Bedpost Overnight?)" It had been a hit in England, but when released in the United States for the first time in 1959, it was not successful. Then, in 1961, Ginsburg received a copy from a listener and began to play it, and after several days of heavy airplay, the song took off and became a hit in America.

During the Payola scandal, Ginsburg was among a number of high-profile Boston disc jockeys (including Norm Prescott, Bob Clayton, and Joe Smith) called upon to testify before a congressional hearing in Washington, D.C., in early 1960. Several of the announcers, Ginsburg among them, acknowledged receiving monetary "gifts" from record promoters over the past several years. In Ginsburg's case, he told the committee that the gifts totaled $4,400 over a three-year period. But Ginsburg was never implicated in any wrongdoing, nor was it proved that he played certain records because he had been paid to do so. Reporters covering the hearings were divided in their opinions of whether payola had occurred, or whether the hearings were much ado about nothing. As for Ginsburg's role, some journalists seemed willing to give him the benefit of the doubt, referring to him as "scholarly" and "soft-spoken", and quoting his assertion that he was never influenced to play songs he did not personally believe in. But others were more skeptical, and accused him of being evasive and giving "excuses" for why record promoters had given him gifts.

Throughout his Top 40 career, Ginsburg was regarded as a credible voice for reaching the teen audience. It was said of him that airplay on his show could make a record a hit. Record companies which asked him to do commercials often saw increased sales. This was the case for such records as "Roses Are Red" by Bobby Vinton and "Monster Mash" by Bobby (Boris) Pickett. Ginsburg also reported his weekly "picks" (songs he believed would become hits) to trade publications such as Billboard magazine. As was the custom in Top 40 radio, record companies would bring up-and-coming singers to do guest appearances, which further helped sales. Among the local stars Ginsburg promoted were The Rockin' Ramrods and Freddie Cannon. Cannon subsequently recorded a promotional song for Ginsburg, "Arnie Ginsburg, the guy with the swinging show." Ginsburg was also known for his record hops, dances that were held at local venues; he often hosted them at the Surf Ballroom in Nantasket Beach.

It was common practice in the Top 40 era for disc jockeys to do their show six days (or nights) a week. Ginsburg, however, was heard all seven nights. This was accomplished through audiotape: He recorded one of his weekly night shows for playback on Saturday night, and also recorded a new show for Sunday playback during the week. This practice was highly unusual at the time and only became more prevalent in the radio business in the 1980s, when radio networks began to do the same.

== Trademark persona ==
Ginsburg became known for his collection of bells, whistles, horns, and other sound effects, which he frequently used on the air during his show. He was often called "Woo-Woo" because of the train whistle he used on the air as part of that collection of sound effects. This particular sound went back to his early days as a disc jockey—beginning at WBOS, when he named his program the Night Train show; his theme song contained the lyrics "Gather 'round, everybody; 'cause you're about to hear/the show that's gonna make you/smile from ear to ear/It's Arnie Ginsburg, on the Night Train show, at 16-hundred ... on your radio." It was recorded by a local group called the 3Ds. He continued to use the theme song and call his show the Night Train when he went to WMEX; he simply removed the portion of the chorus that said "1600 on your radio." The Night Train radio theme song and a re-creation of his Top 40–style could later be heard as part of the "Cruisin'" series. This was a series of albums (later issued as compact discs) that showcased major top-40 personalities from a number of cities. The "Cruisin' 1961" disc featured Arnie Ginsburg. While the Cruisin' discs were re-enactments, they still gave listeners the opportunity to hear the way each of the major Top 40 DJs did their show; thus, the 1961 disc showcased how Arnie utilized his trademark sound effects, and also contained typical commercials, hit songs of that year, and Arnie's unique manner of chatting with the audience.

A reference to Arnie Ginsburg is contained in the song "Fender Stratocaster" by Jonathan Richman (on his 1989 eponymous album). Richman includes Ginsburg in the litany of lyrical references to what the trademark guitar was "like":
"Like Woo Woo Ginsberg at the juke box joint/
You hear the sound and you get the point."

== Later career ==
While Arnie Ginsburg is best known from his days at WMEX, he also spent some time at other stations in Boston. In early 1967, when WRKO changed format to Top 40, the station's new management wanted to build the new radio station around a well-known local radio figure, and Ginsburg was their first choice. However, the plans were interrupted. Ginsburg was on the air for less than a month when his former boss, WMEX owner Maxwell (Mac) Richmond, served the station with a court injunction, enforcing a non-compete clause which stated that if Ginsburg left WMEX, he could not work on air at any other station for 18 months. The case made its way through the courts and finally, Ginsburg was ordered off the air. But although he could not be heard on the airwaves for a while, he was able to stay in the business with WRKO, which moved him into sales. Ginsburg also sold all the time slots for WRKO-FM. Later, in 1970, he went on to become the general manager of WBCN. This proved a very controversial move, as the staff was opposed to the idea of a former Top 40 personality serving as the manager of an album rock station—at that time, FM album rock prided itself on being the antithesis of AM Top 40.

By 1972, Ginsburg was working on the AM side again, as the General Manager of WWEL. In 1973 he joined Boston's largest station, WBZ, producing and hosting a Saturday-night oldies show with all his familiar gimmicks: noisemakers, silly puns, and kidding with the newscasters and weathermen. In 1975, Ginsburg was hired by WMEX to do a similar, Saturday-night series of four-hour shows. Ginsburg also syndicated a customized weekly oldies show to New England radio stations. By 1979, he advanced to become partner of WXKS-FM "Kiss 108" and managed WXKS AM when it changed format to "Music of Your Life." He also became co-owner, along with Boston radio personality John Garabedian, of V-66, a music video TV station serving Boston, in 1985. The station not only featured hit music videos; it also featured local announcers talking about the music, and also talking about the music scene in greater Boston. As Ginsburg told a reporter, it was envisioned as "the equivalent of a radio station on television." The venture proved very costly, however, and the station was put up for sale in 1986.

In his later years, Arnie Ginsburg was an occasional guest on Boston radio, such as on WBZ (1030 AM)'s "Steve Leveille Program", which aired weeknights from midnight to 5:00 AM. In 2008, he was inducted into the Massachusetts Broadcasters Hall of Fame.

== Personal life and retirement ==
Ginsburg's spouse and longtime companion was Carlos A. Vega, a professor of Spanish at Wellesley College.

As Ginsburg reached retirement age, he migrated north to Ogunquit, Maine (about 75 miles north of Boston). He had spent summers there in his younger years and had developed a hometown affinity for this artists' colony and resort on the coast of southern Maine. Ogunquit residents came to recognize Ginsburg when he rode his moped into town during the warmer months, and in time he became a fixture in the community. Prior to his death, Ginsburg lived in a small house near Perkins Cove, a picturesque area visited by many tourists throughout the year.

After an erroneous report of his death in mid-June, Ginsburg died on June 26, 2020, from Alzheimer's disease.
