= Joseph B. Davol =

American painter (1864–1923)

- Born: Joseph Benjamin Davol; August 25, 1864; Chicago, Illinois, U.S.
- Died: June 15, 1923 (aged 58); Ogunquit, Maine, U.S.
- Occupations: Marine painter; art teacher

Joseph Benjamin Davol (August 25, 1864 – June 15, 1923) was an American marine painter and art teacher.

He was born in Chicago. Following art studies in Boston and New York, Davol studied in Paris at the Académie Julian in 1895–96. In Paris he studies with Henri Laurens, Benjamin, and Constant.

He was a student of Charles Herbert Woodbury, and lived in Ogunquit, Maine during his active years a professional painter until his death. Commissioned the building of a studio from the noted architect John Calvin Stevens.

He died in Ogunquit and his obituary appeared in the New York Times Sunday June 17, 1923.

== Exhibitions and Honors ==
- Member of the Salmagundi Club (salmagundi.org)
- Exhibited extensively at:
- Corcoran Gallery
- Pennsylvania Academy of the Fine Arts (the oldest art museum and school in the nation)
- Boston Art Club: Official link
- Exhibition about the Boston Art Club.
- Silver medal winner at the 1915 Panama-Pacific International Exposition (1915) in San Francisco

== Collections ==
- Portland Museum of Art, Portland, ME portlandmuseum.org
- Farnsworth Museum of Art, Rockland ME farnsworthmuseum.org
- Ogunquit Museum of Art
- Ogunquit Memorial Library

== Bibliography ==
Chadbourne, Janice H. and Karl Gabosh and Charles O. Vogel, ed. The Boston Art Club Exhibition Record, 1873–1909. Madison, Connecticut: Sound View Press, 1991. ISBN 0-932087-18-3 Available through the Boston Art Club.

== Images ==
Davol Beach at Ogunquit, ca. 1915

Davol Paintings In Farnsworth Collection
