= Josias River =

River in Maine, United States

Coordinates: 43°14′17.1″N 70°35′38.8″W

Location
- Country: United States

Physical characteristics
- Source
  - location: Maine

The Josias River is a 2.7-mile-long (4.3 km) river in southern Maine in the United States.

The Josias River rises from a collection of small ponds, marshlands and vernal pools situated along the southeastern flank of Mount Agamenticus in the town of York, Maine, augmented by tributaries Clay Hill Brook and Muddy Brook. The river follows a northeasterly path through the towns of York and Ogunquit, Maine before crossing under Route 1 in Ogunquit, then taking a sharp bend southeast and eventually feeding into Perkins Cove, a popular artist and tourist area. The Josias River then empties into the Gulf of Maine and the Atlantic Ocean.

Research into the name of the river has revealed that, like many geographical features, it has gone by various names over time. At one time, for example, it was known as Four Mile Brook. Its current name arose from the Littlefield family, the first recorded settlers of Wells, which once included Ogunquit. Josiah Littlefield owned considerable property along the river, and he built and operated a saw mill at the falls on the river for several years. This naturally resulted in local residents referring to it as "Josiah's river".

Josiah Littlefield was abducted and taken to Canada in 1708 during the French and Indian Wars, where he spent two years seeking his freedom (freedom was usually bought), only to be killed in an Indian attack in 1712, a couple years after his return. The river was named in his memory.

== See also ==
- List of rivers of Maine
