= Ogunquit River =

Coordinates: 43°15′1.2″N 70°35′43.3″W

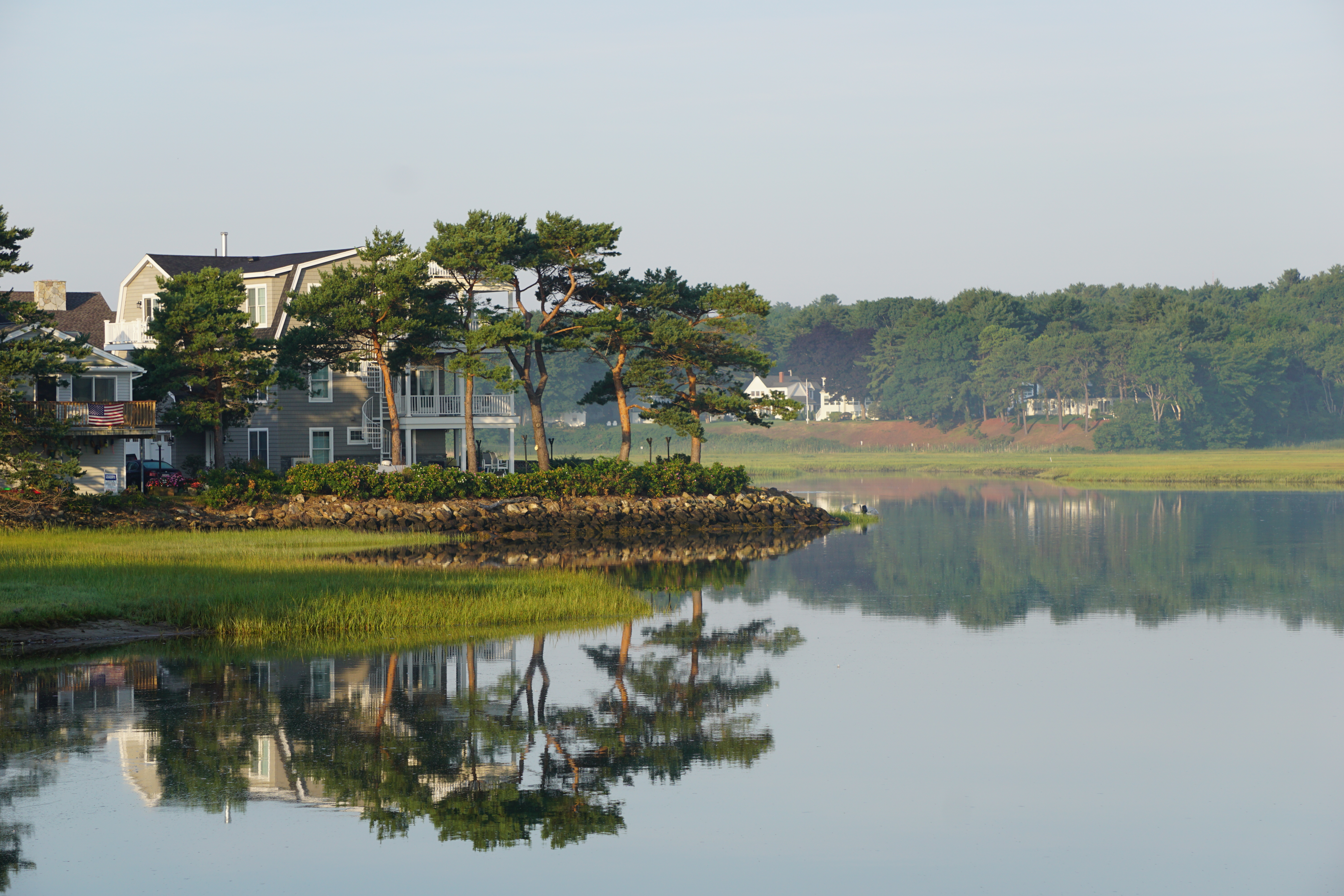
- Ogunquit River in Wells

Location
- Country: United States

Physical characteristics
- Source
  - location: Maine

The Ogunquit River (/oʊˈɡʌŋkwɪt/ oh-GUNG-kwit) is a 9.8-mile-long (15.8 km) tidal river in York County, Maine. Its source is a small marsh in the town of South Berwick and it flows through the towns of York, Wells and Ogunquit before reaching its end in the Atlantic Ocean. Its tributaries include Tatnic Brook, Green Brook, Bragdon Brook and Stevens Brook. For much of its course it serves as the border between Wells and Ogunquit.

== Images ==
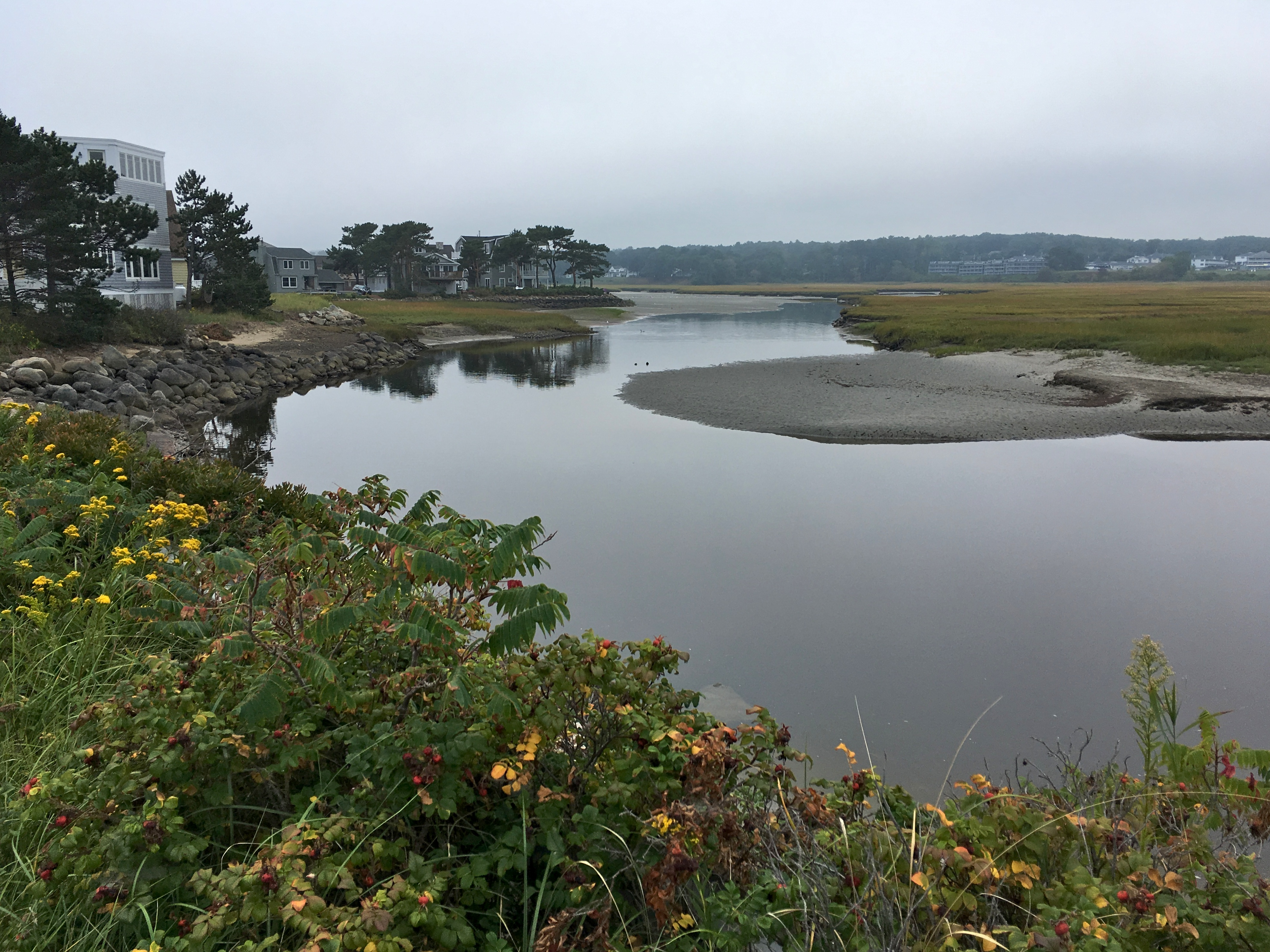

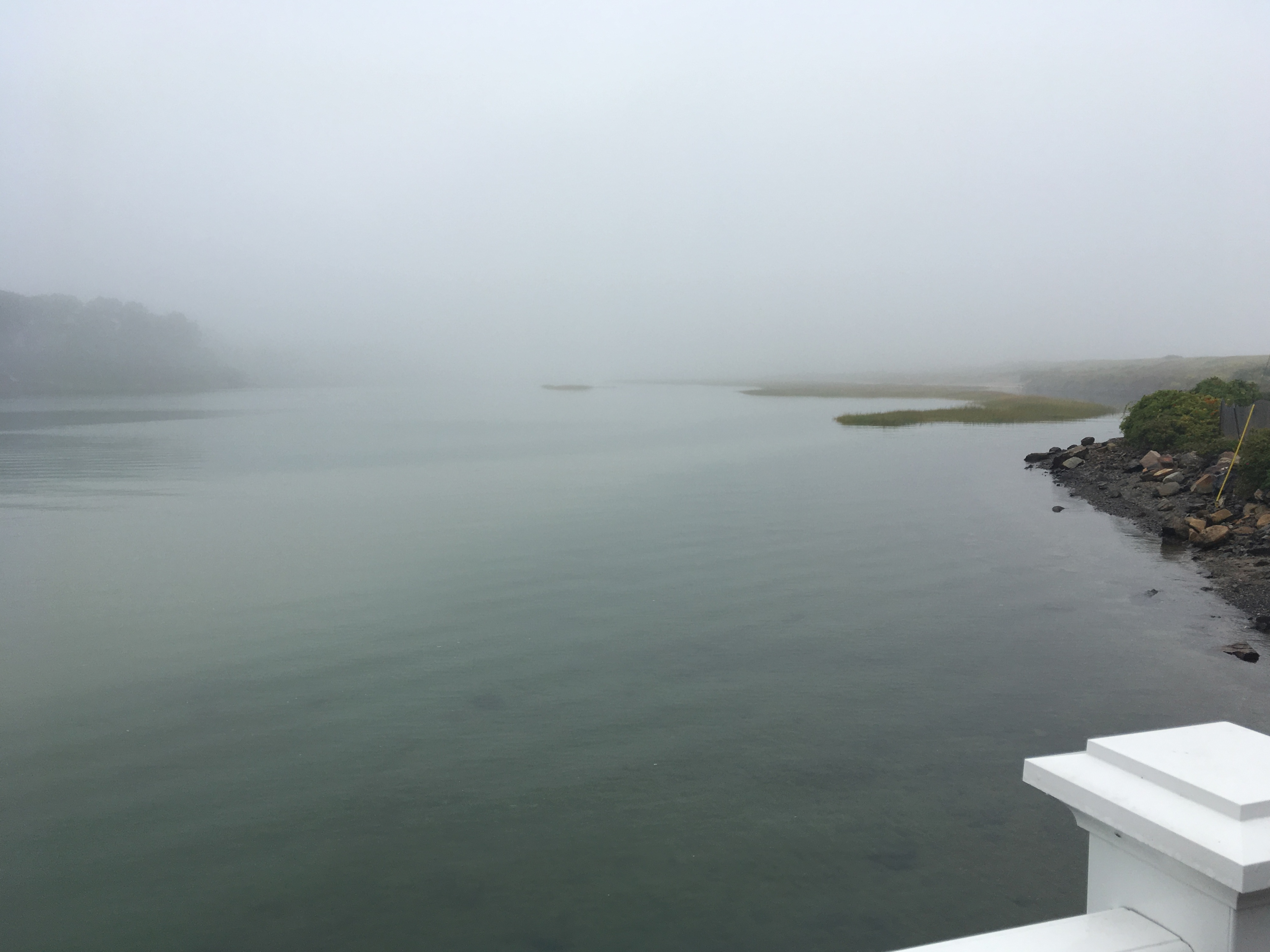
High tide

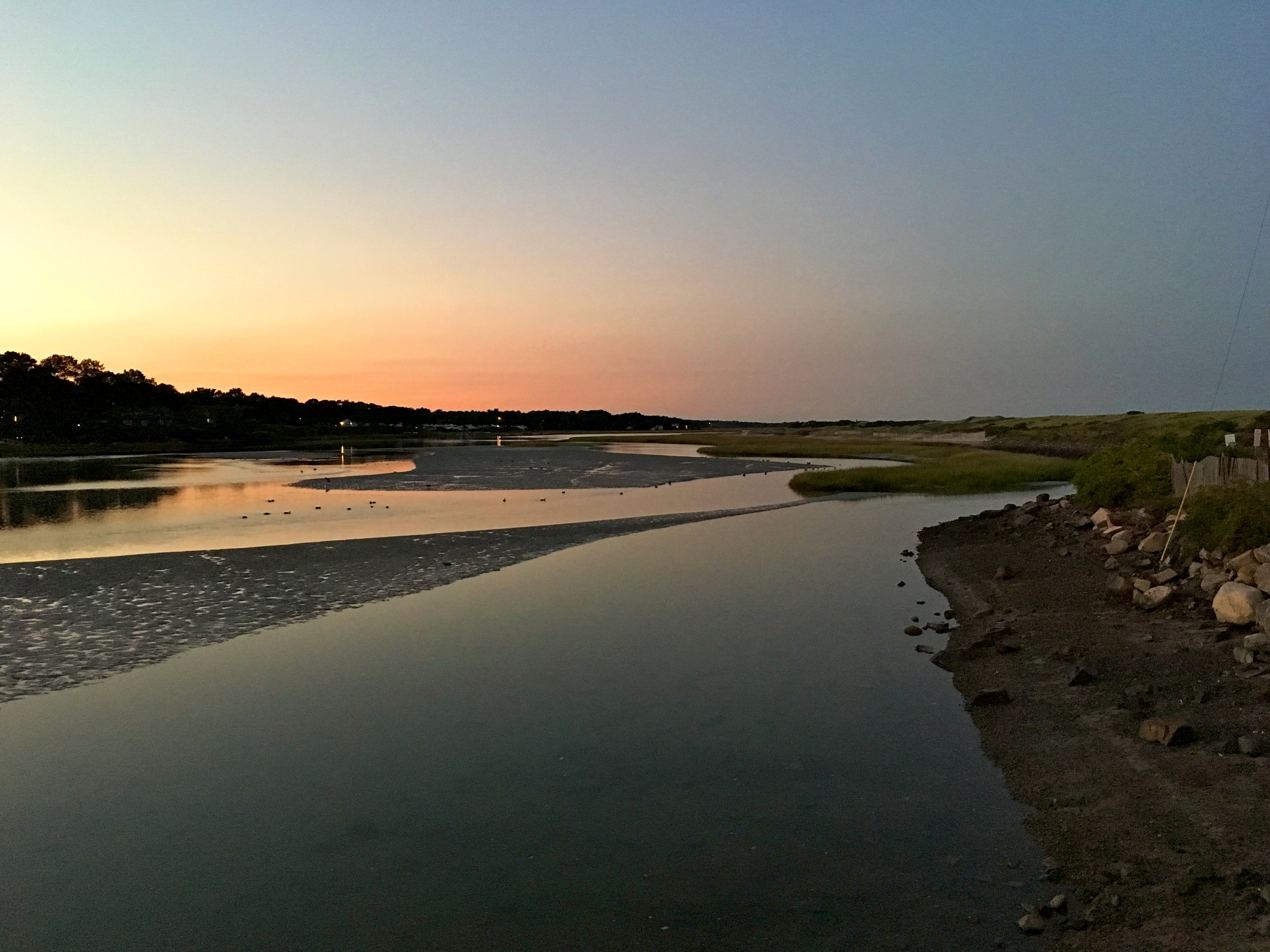
Mid tide

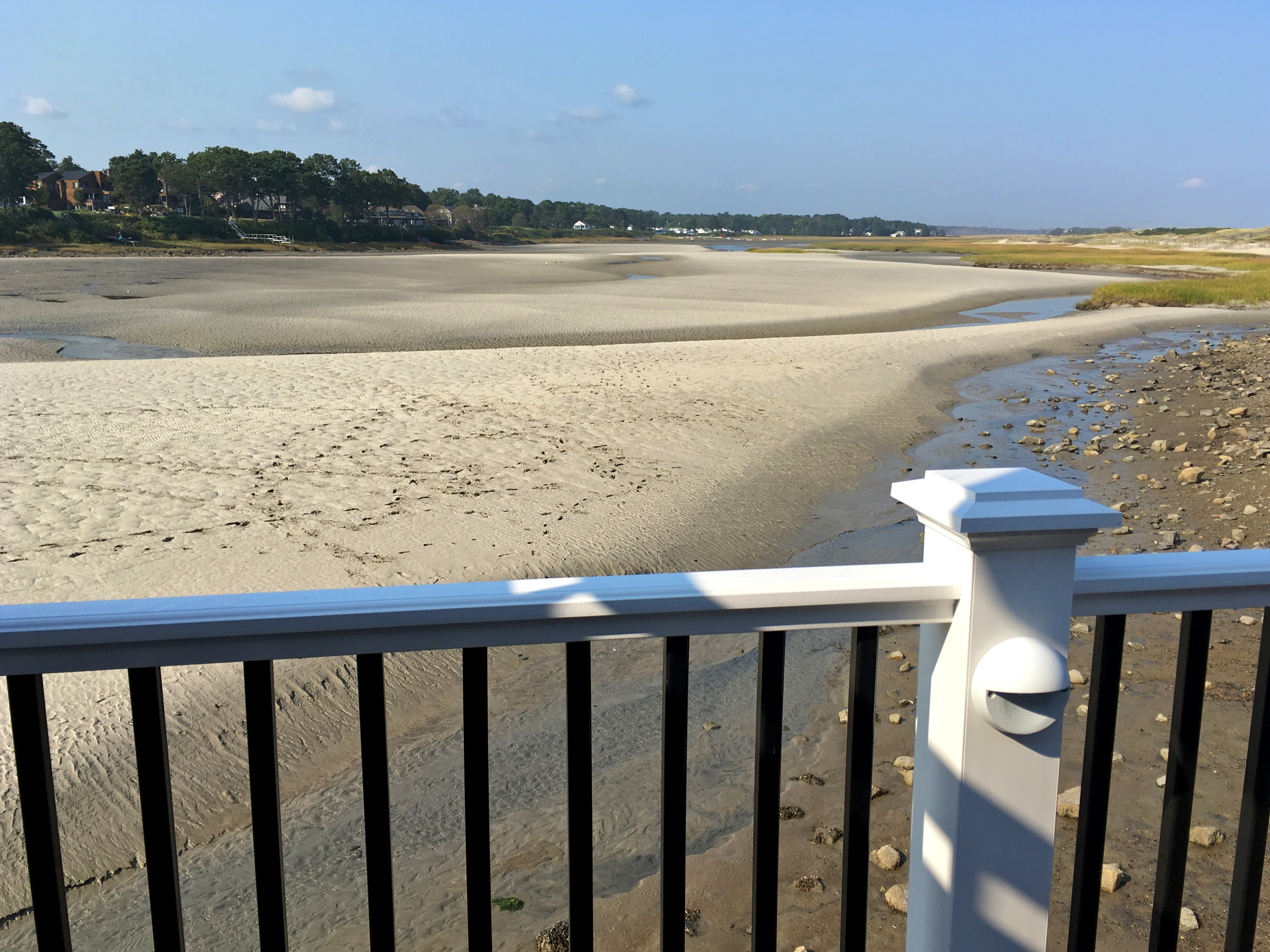
Low tide

== See also ==
- List of rivers of Maine
- Ogunquit
