= Tidal river =

River where flow and level are influenced by tides

A tidal river is a river whose flow and level are caused by tides. A section of a larger river affected by the tides is a tidal reach, but it may sometimes be considered a tidal river if it has been given a separate and other title name.

Generally, tidal rivers are short rivers with relatively low discharge rates but high overall discharge, which generally implies a shallow river with a large coastal mouth. In some cases, high tides impound downstream flowing freshwater, reversing the flow and increasing the water level of the lower section of river, forming large estuaries. High tides can be noticed as far as 100 kilometres (62 mi) upstream. Oregon's Coquille River is one such stream for which that effect can be noticed.

== Overview ==
The area of a tidal river can be difficult to define. The term "tidal river" generally encompasses the area upriver of the maximum limit of salinity intrusion and downriver of tidal water level fluctuations. This classification is based on both tidal trends and salinity. By this definition, a tidal river will be affected by tides, surges, and sea level variation, though its water may not have a high salinity content. If that is the case, this section of river can be known as a "tidal freshwater river" or a "river reach". In terms of tides, tidal rivers are classified as microtidal (<2 m), mesotidal (2–4 m), and macrotidal (>4 m). Areas of brackish water seaward of the tidal river section are often called estuaries. A phenomenon commonly associated with tidal rivers is a tidal bore, where a wall of water travels upriver during a flood tide.

Freshwater tidal rivers discharge large amounts of sediment and nutrients into the ocean. This is a necessary influx for the global water balance. Rivers contribute about 95% of sediment entering the ocean. Discharge estimates from freshwater tidal rivers are important for informing water resource management and climate analyses. These discharge amounts can be estimated using tidal statistics. Some challenges to estimating discharge amounts include reversing tidal flow, compensation flow for Stokes drift, spring-neap water storage effects, lateral circulation, and multiple distributaries or ebb and flood channels.

== Threats ==
Tidal rivers face threats due to climate change and other human-caused impacts. In tidal rivers' deltas, mineral and water extraction, reduced sediment input, and floodplain engineering are causing the sinking of deltas. This, combined with rising sea levels, is causing tidal rivers to become deeper, which amplifies the tidal motion and increases the extent of salt intrusion. Increasing salinity in tidal rivers could have a detrimental impact on freshwater organisms and alter tidal river ecosystems significantly. The increasing effect of deltaic subsidence, which is due to the removal of gas, oil, and water from deltas, will also increase the risk of flooding.

== Tidal river examples ==
=== Rio de la Plata ===
The Rio de la Plata is a tidal river on the border between Uruguay and Argentina. It is classified as microtidal, as its tidal range is less than 1 meter. This river is significant mostly due to its size, as more than one tidal wavelength can be accommodated in this river's estuary. Similarly to most tidal rivers, saltwater does not extend far up the river, due to its large volume of freshwater discharge.

=== Amazon River ===
The Amazon River has the highest flow, largest volume of sediment discharge, and largest drainage basin of any river in the world. Because of its large flow volume, saltwater never enters the mouth of the Amazon River, and the limit of salinity is 150 kilometres (93 mi) seaward of the river mouth. The Amazon River is classified as macrotidal, as its tidal range is 4 to 8 meters at the mouth of the river. During low-flow periods, this river's tidal area may extend over 1,000 kilometres (620 mi) into the Amazon depression.

== Navigation ==
The tidal behaviour of a river is an important consideration in riverboat navigation. For major rivers, such as the Saint Lawrence River (and the associated Saint Lawrence Seaway), publications such as an atlas of surface currents (or tidal currents) may be available, based on sophisticated hydrodynamic models, subject to empirical validation.

== Images ==
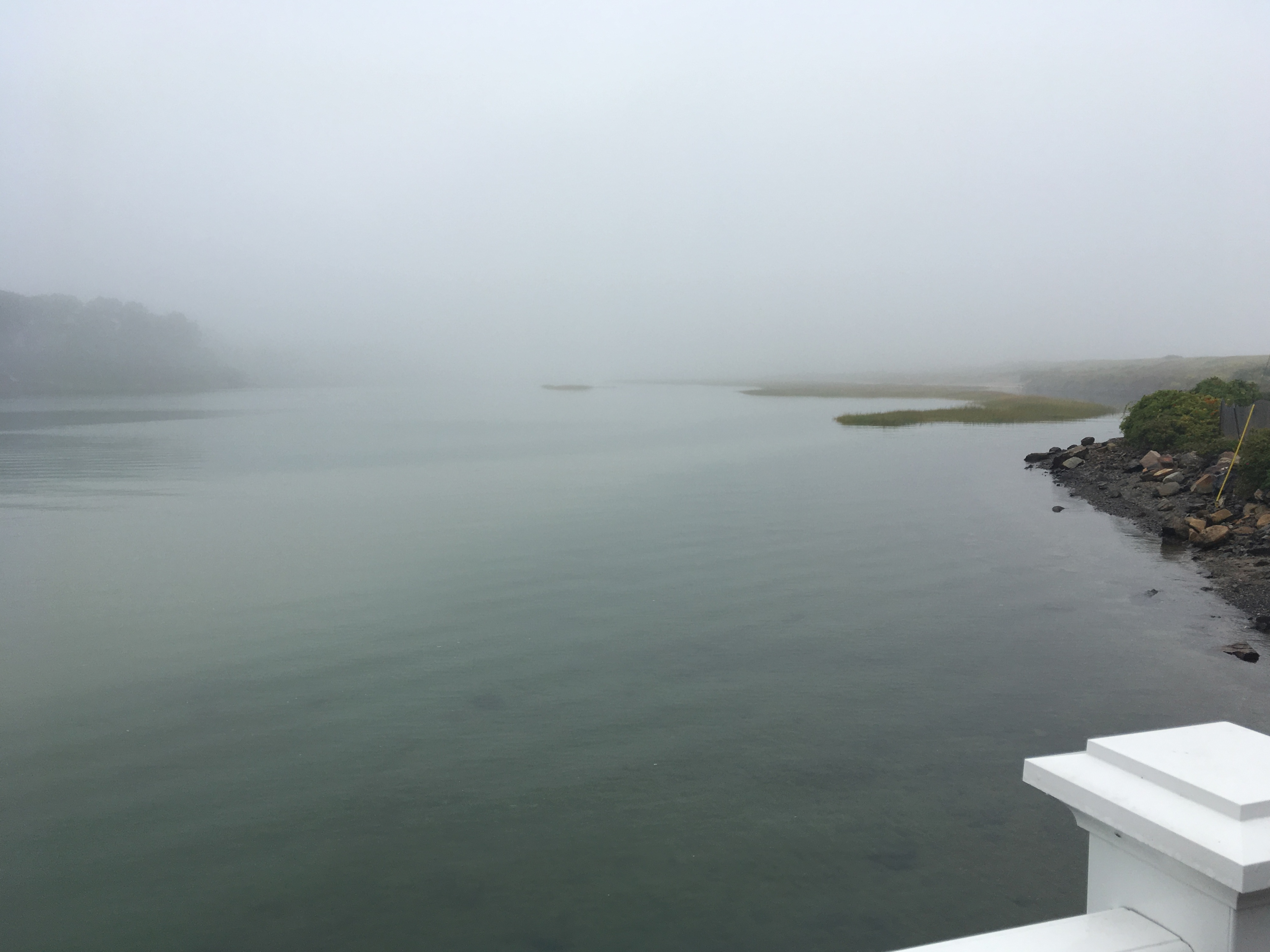
Ogunquit River at high tide

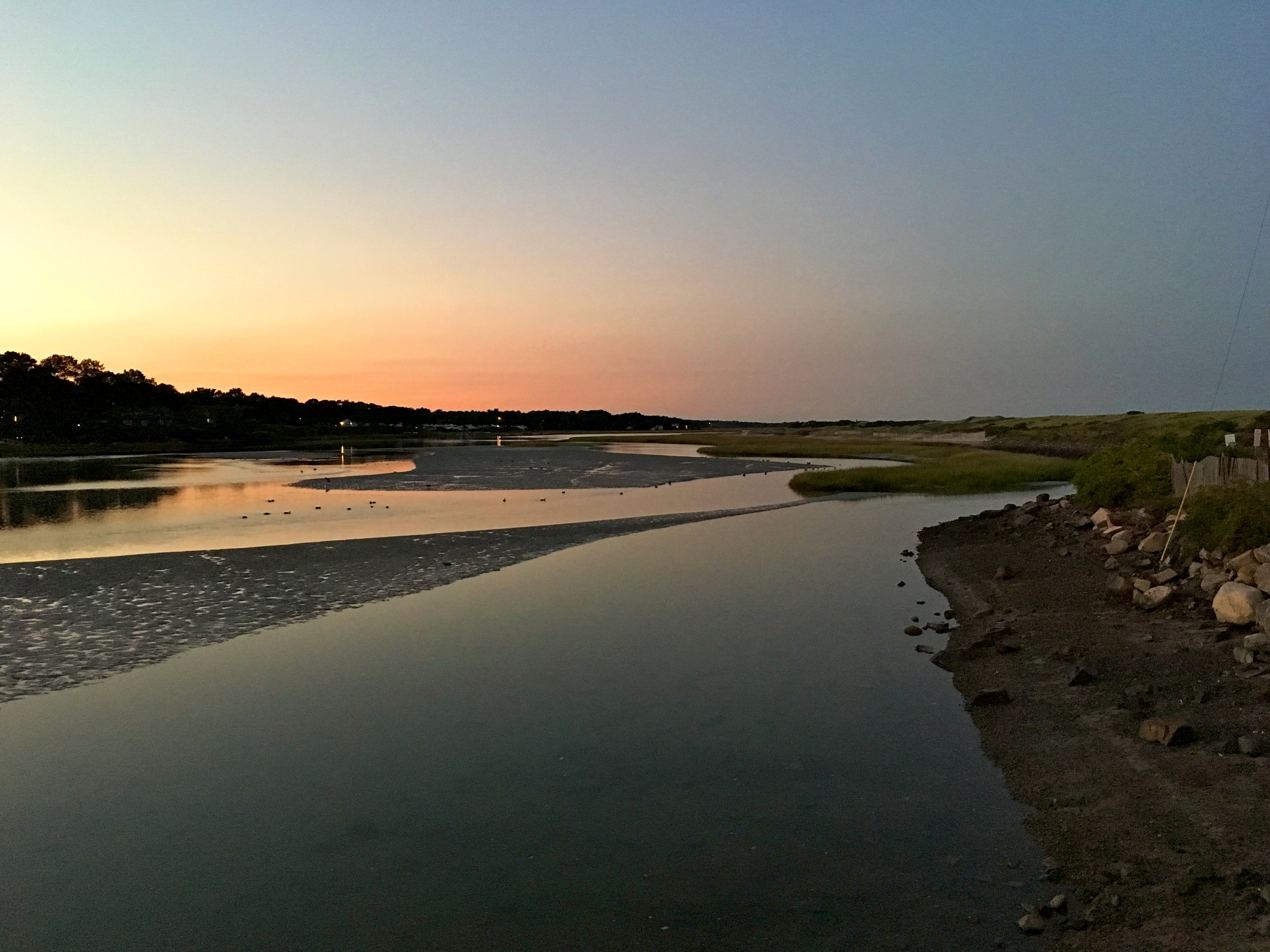
Ogunquit River at mid tide

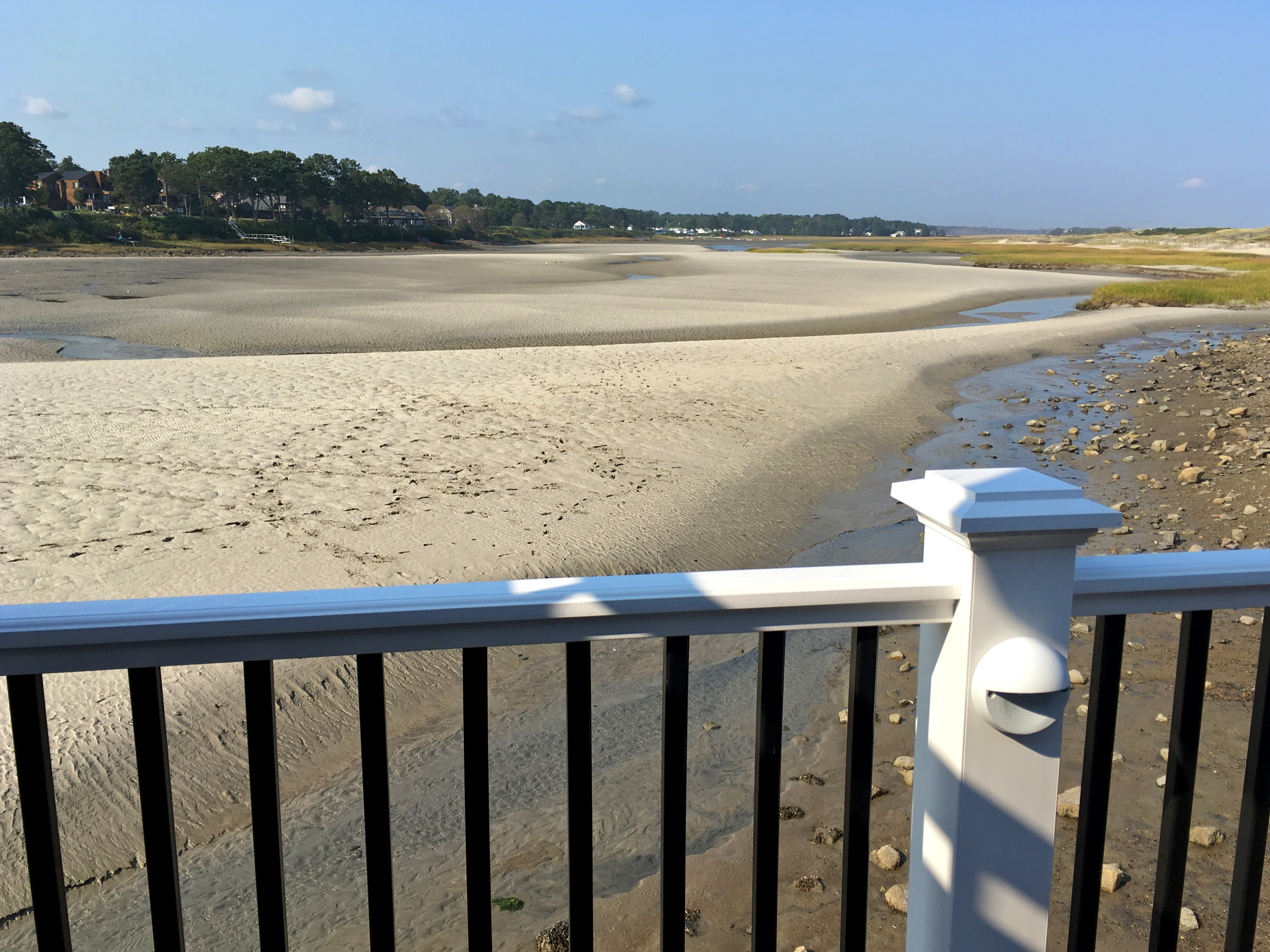
Ogunquit River at low tide

== See also ==
- Estuary
- Ria
- Tidal reach
- Tidal bore
- Tidal creek
