= Peter George Olenchuk =

United States Army general

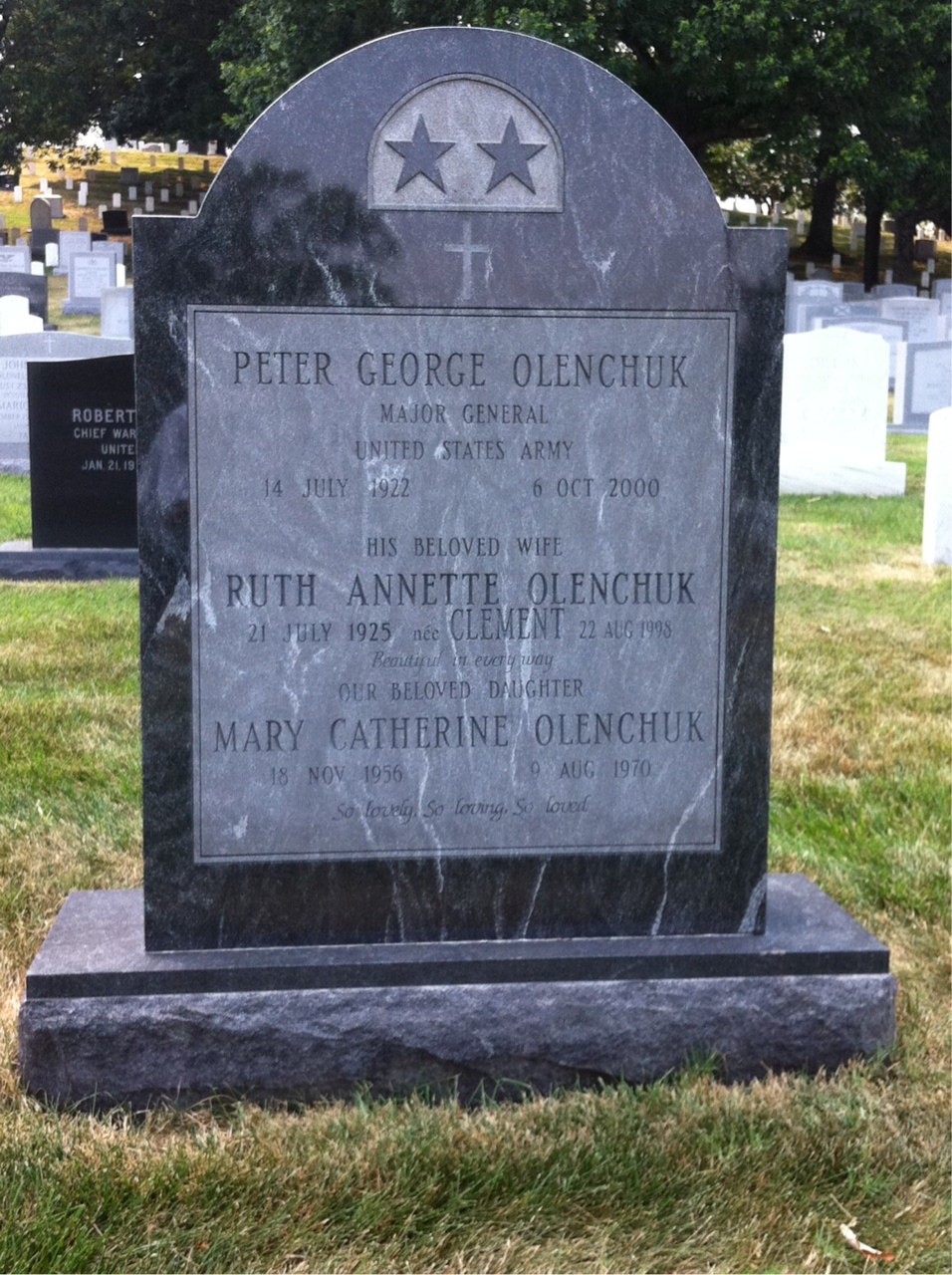
Grave at Arlington National Cemetery

Peter George Olenchuk (July 14, 1922 – October 6, 2000) was a major general in the United States Army.

== Biography ==
Originally a native of Bayonne, New Jersey, Olenchuk graduated from Lebanon Valley College before obtaining a M.A. in Bacteriology from the University of Wisconsin-Madison and a M.B.A. in Business Administration from George Washington University. He married Ruth Clement and had three children. Olenchuk died on October 6, 2000, in Ogunquit, Maine. He is buried at Arlington National Cemetery.

== Career ==
Olenchuk enlisted in the Army Corps of Engineers in 1943 and served in North Africa and the Far East in World War II. He became a commissioned officer in 1945 and his assignments included two tours of duty in the Vietnam War. In 1963 Olenchuk headed a team to observe and evaluate "Operation Ranch Hand" the name given to the defoliation and crop destruction programs in Vietnam. The resulting Olenchuk Report pronounced these early programs to be both militarily and technologically effective and was instrumental in obtaining approval for the continuation and expansion of what has come to be known as The Agent Orange Program. From 1966 - 1968 he assumed command of Fort Detrick, at that time the U.S. center for biological warfare, in Frederick, Maryland. In the late 1960s he oversaw the controversial Operation CHASE. In 1973 he became Director of Material Acquisition of the Army. Later he became Assistant Deputy Chief of Staff for Research, Development, and Acquisition. He retired in 1975. He was posthumously inducted into the Chemical Corps Regimental Association Hall of Fame in 2001.

Awards he received include the Army Distinguished Service Medal, the Legion of Merit, the Air Medal, and the Joint Service Commendation Medal.
