= Mountfort Coolidge =

American painter and antique dealer (1888–1954)

- Born: 1888; Brooklyn, New York
- Died: August 27, 1954 (aged 65–66); Ogunquit, Maine
- Known for: Painting, Antiques Trade
- Notable work: The Rising Moon – The Golden Fleece, 1912 Aerial Painting (title unknown)
- Style: Landscape painting
- Movement: Post-Impressionism
- Partner: Channing Hare

Mountfort (or Mountford) Coolidge (1888–1954) was an American post-impressionist landscape painter and antique dealer. He was born in Brooklyn, New York in 1888 and later moved to Ogunquit, Maine, where he resided for around forty years. His landscapes were recognized for their emphasis on form and contour. One of his early works has also been described as prefiguring the modernist idea of aeropainting.

== Artistic Career ==
=== Work and Reception ===
Coolidge studied painting with Hamilton Easter Field and Robert Henri, and he also had associations with Marsden Hartley and Bernard Karfiol, among others. He was a member of the Société Nationale des Beaux-Arts and exhibited at distinguished galleries across the United States and Europe, particularly in New York City, where some of his work was shown at the MacDowell Club alongside paintings by Edward Hopper. He also painted a portrait of the Russian writer Maxim Gorky.

Coolidge continued to paint after moving to Maine around 1917, and in 1921 he provided ten paintings for a solo exhibition at Kraushaar Galleries. In a review of the show, an article in American Art News wrote that Coolidge "inclines to the formula of Post-Impressionism" and that he "seeks beauty in form rather than in atmosphere; his landscapes are undulating and solid, even the rocks having curling contours, and his colors are dull and deep."

=== 1912 Aerial Painting ===
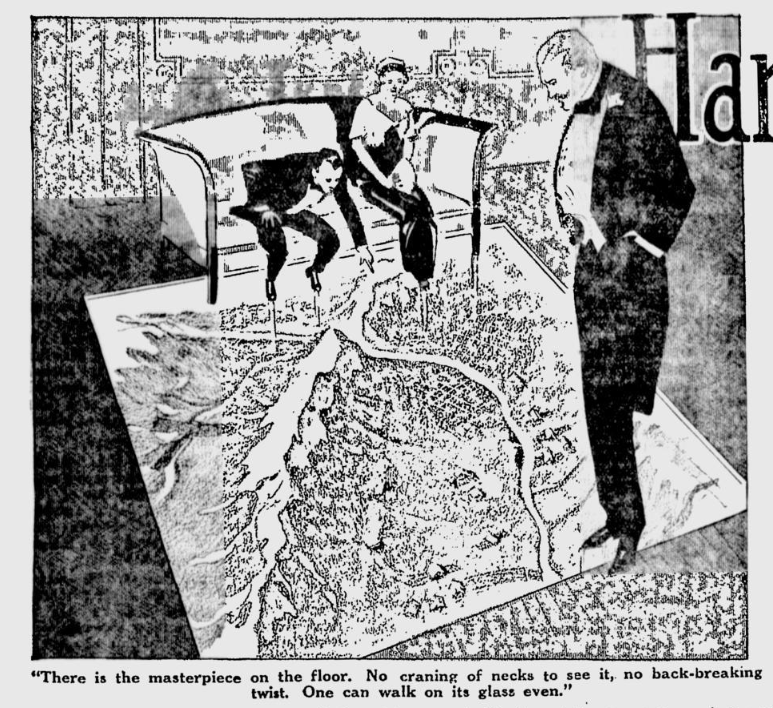
Illustration and caption from a 1913 article about Coolidge's painting in The Spokesman-Review.

In the fall of 1912, having received a commission from an Italian Count in Rimini who was interested in aviation, Coolidge decided to paint an aerial view of the Italian Alps as they would have been seen from an early airplane. He insisted that the painting was to be placed not on the wall but inside a glass case beneath the floor, so that, as one anonymous critic put it, "while sitting in this room you have the sensation of flying in an aeroplane and looking at the earth beneath your feet."

From 1912 to 1913, the painting became the subject of numerous news articles. One such article, in a 1913 issue of the Spokesman-Review, juxtaposes a caricature of Coolidge's painting with Futurist works by Carlo Carrà and Umberto Boccioni. Unpacking this comparison in more detail, a 2024 research article in the International Yearbook of Futurism Studies has suggested that, while Coolidge was not himself a Futurist, his painting can be understood as an attempt to provoke his viewer's imagination in a way that prefigured later Futurist ideas about aeropainting.

=== Collections ===
Works by Coolidge are held in the collections of the Ogunquit Museum of American Art and the Farnsworth Art Museum, and two photographs of Coolidge are held by the Smithsonian American Art Museum.

== Personal life ==
Coolidge had an intimate lifelong relationship with the painter Channing Hare, with whom he also ran a small antique shop in Ogunquit. The business, which Coolidge and Hare began together in 1920, operated in a building that had previously been a barn and chicken coop. The two artists resided in Palm Beach, Florida during the winter.

Coolidge and Hare were also charitable and went on to donate several works of historical art to different museums, including two ancient Roman paintings currently held by the Worcester Art Museum; the Bennington Museum holds a collection of historical glassware and other objects of decorative art called the Channing Hare-Mountfort Coolidge Collection.

Coolidge died in Ogunquit on August 27, 1954.

== Note ==
Coolidge's first name has been spelled alternatively as "Mountfort" and "Mountford" (and occasionally "Montfort") in the historical record. The name of Coolidge's own business was spelled "Mountfort Coolidge Antiques".
