= Channing Hare =

American painter

- Born: 1899
- Died: 1976 (aged 76–77)
- Known for: Painting
- Notable work: Portrait of a Woman, The End of Summer, Anita, The Grey Rose
- Style: Portraiture
- Movement: Realism, Surrealism
- Partner: Mountfort Coolidge

Channing Weir Hare (1899–1976) was an American painter. He was born in New York and lived in Ogunquit, Maine and Palm Beach, Florida, where he was best known for his portraiture. He painted portraits of several notable public figures, including Cy Twombly, Booth Tarkington, Sally Rand, and Alexander Woollcott. Some of his other work was markedly influenced by the Surrealist movement. It has been suggested that the surrealist motifs in Hare's painting helped him to express himself as a gay man at a time when LGBTQ identities were marginalized.

Hare was a member of the Art Students League, where he studied under Robert Henri, George Bellows, and William Zorach. He later exhibited work at several distinguished galleries in New York (including the Metropolitan Museum of Art); Washington, D.C.; Pennsylvania; Florida; and elsewhere. In 2000, Yale University's Jonathan Edwards College included work by Hare in an exhibition titled Private Realisms: American Paintings 1934-1949. Works by Hare are held by the Ogunquit Museum of American Art, the Pennsylvania Academy of the Fine Arts, and the Figge Art Museum. Photographs of Hare are held by the Smithsonian American Art Museum, the Museum of Fine Arts, Boston and the RISD Museum.

== Personal life ==
Hare had an intimate lifelong relationship with the painter Mountfort Coolidge until the latter's death in 1954. In 1920, the two opened a small antique shop together in Ogunquit.

Hare and Coolidge were also charitable and went on to donate several works of historical art to different museums, including two ancient Roman paintings currently held by the Worcester Art Museum; the Bennington Museum holds a collection of historical glassware and other objects of decorative art called the Channing Hare-Mountfort Coolidge Collection. Hare himself donated several items that are currently held by Cooper Hewitt, Smithsonian Design Museum.

Hare also adopted the American painter Stephen Hopkins Hensel.
