= Perkins Cove =

Coastal village in Ogunquit, Maine

Perkins Cove, Maine
- Village
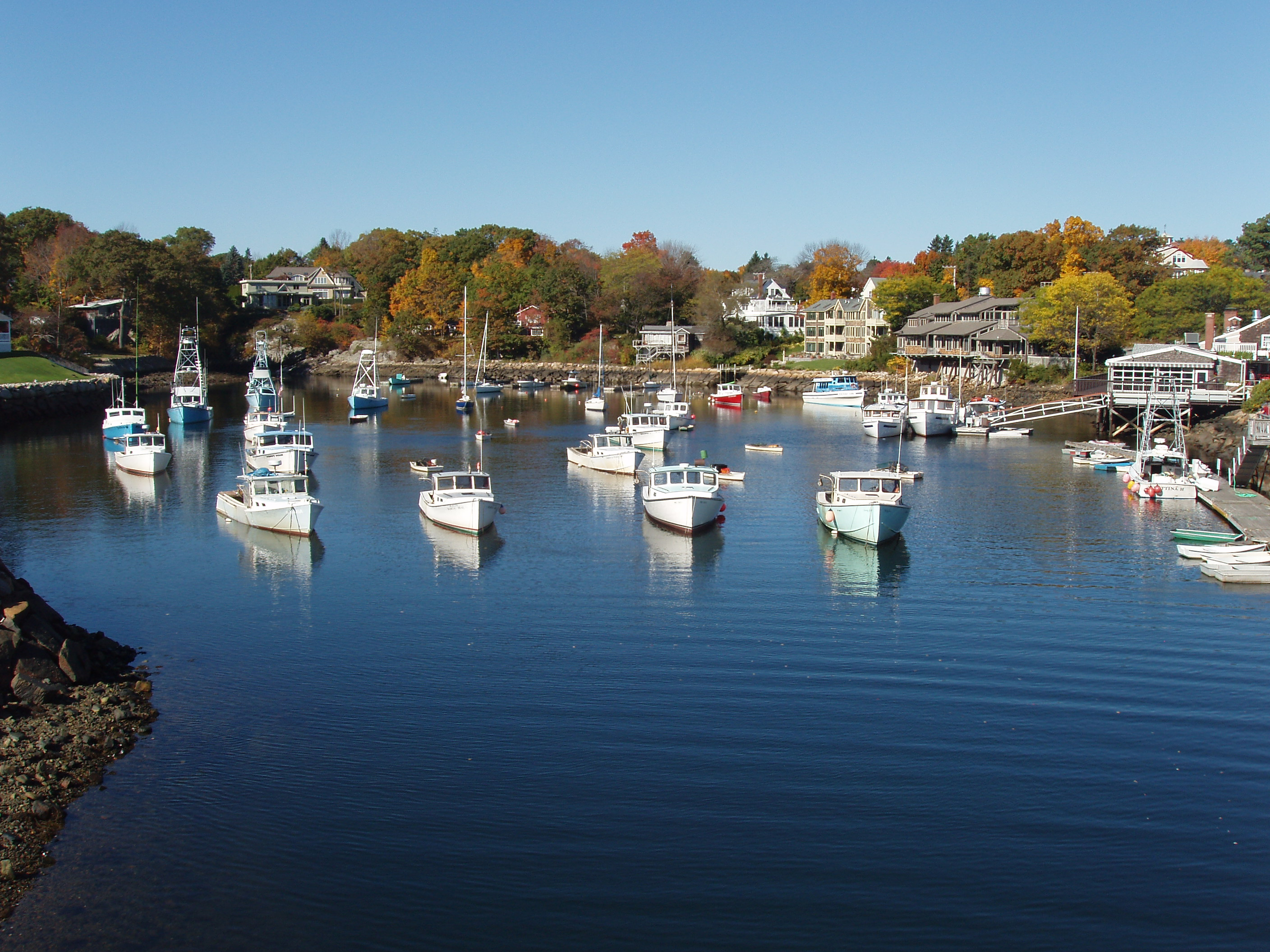
- View from Perkins Cove Drawbridge

- Location within Maine Location within the United States
- Coordinates: 43°14′12.3″N 70°35′24.7″W
- Country: United States
- State: Maine
- County: York
- Town: Ogunquit
- Time zone: UTC-5 (Eastern (EST))
  - Summer (DST): UTC-4 (EDT)
- ZIP Code: 03907
- Area codes: 207
- GNIS feature ID: 573203

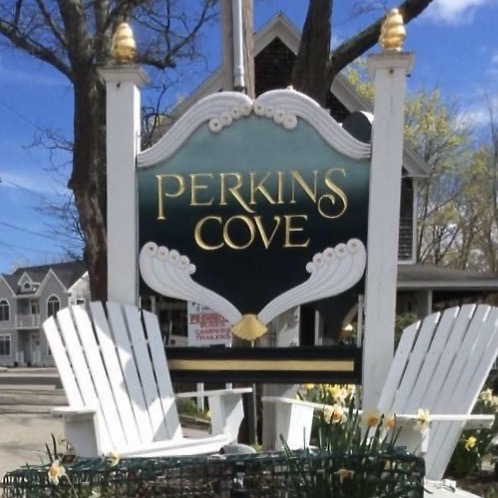
Perkins Cove entrance sign

Perkins Cove is a small harbor bay and fishing village in the town of Ogunquit in York County, Maine, United States.

== History ==
English fishermen first began settling here in the 1620s. Prior to this, the land had been home to the Native Abenaki peoples.

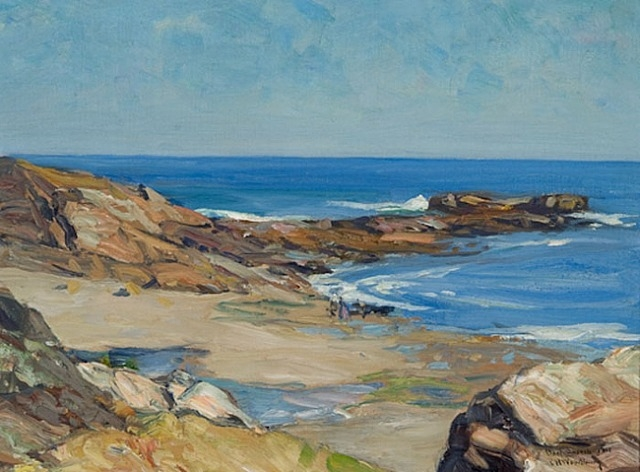
Painting of Perkins Cove by Charles Herbert Waterbury

In the early years of the European settlement, the area was most commonly referred to as Fish Cove or simply "the cove". It wouldn't be until the late 1800s that the name Perkins Cove would be adopted. The Perkins family, one of the earliest seafaring families in the cove, ran a boardinghouse called the "Perkins Cove House" and from that the name was derived.

At the very end of the nineteenth century, Perkins Cove would begin its transformation into a thriving artist colony. It was at this time that painter Charles Woodbury founded his highly regarded art school, drawing in an influx of artists. By 1911, Hamilton Easter Field would also establish a summer art school here, converting old fish shacks into art studios and rentals. The contributions of both men were instrumental in the development of Ogunquit, not only as a flourishing artist hub, but also as a beloved vacation destination.

== Geography ==
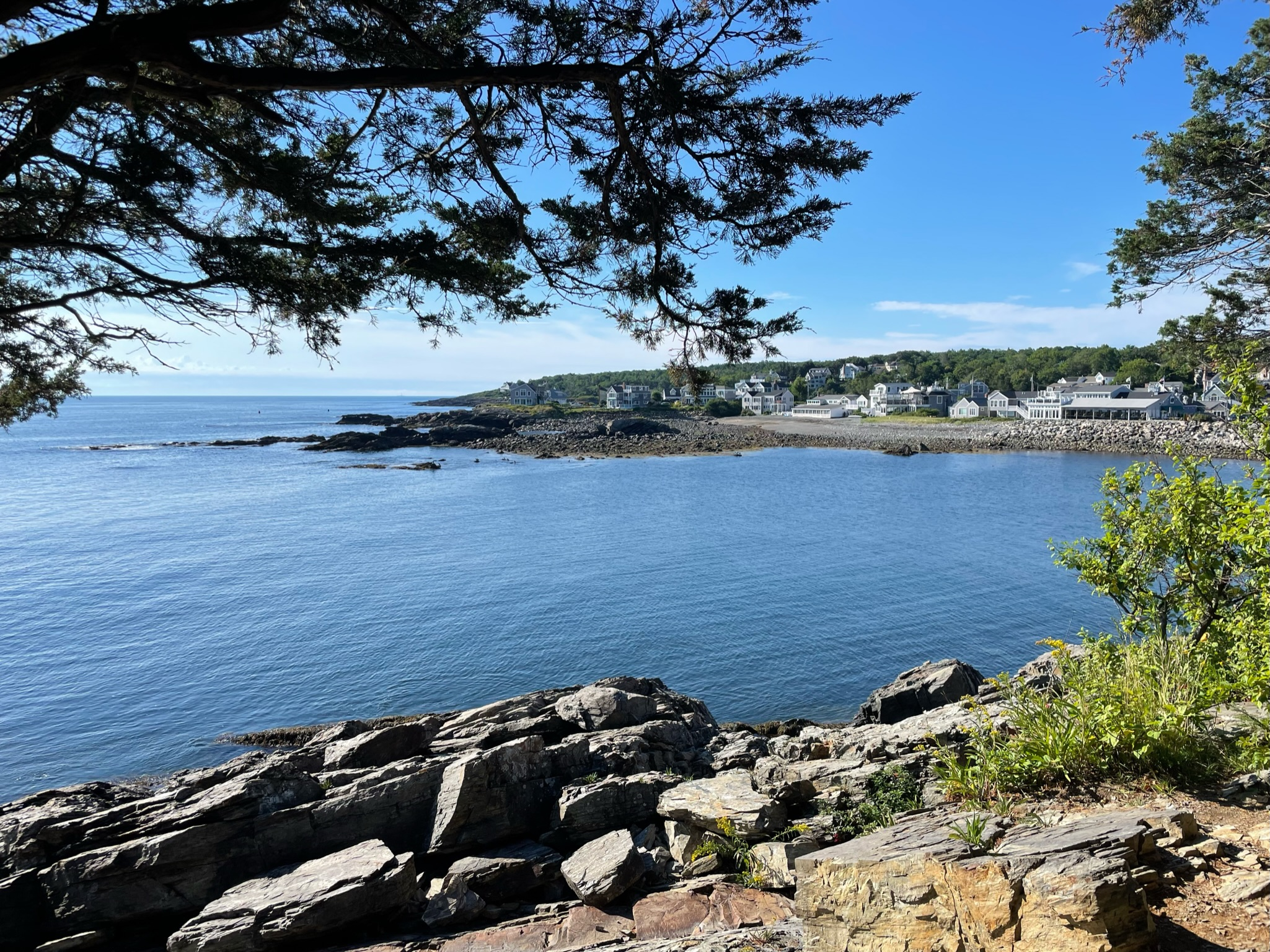
View of the Perkins Cove peninsula from the Marginal Way

The village of Perkins Cove is located on a peninsula, situated between the anchorage basin at the mouth of the Josias River and Oarweed Cove. The Basin, as it is known today, did not exist prior to 1880. It is a man-made inlet, created by digging out a channel between what was formerly Flat Pond and the Gulf of Maine. This provided a shelter for the fishermen to anchor their dories.

The Marginal Way, a mile-long public footpath along the rocky coastal shoreline, stretches from Perkins Cove to central Ogunquit.
