= Ogunquit Memorial Library =

- U.S. National Register of Historic Places
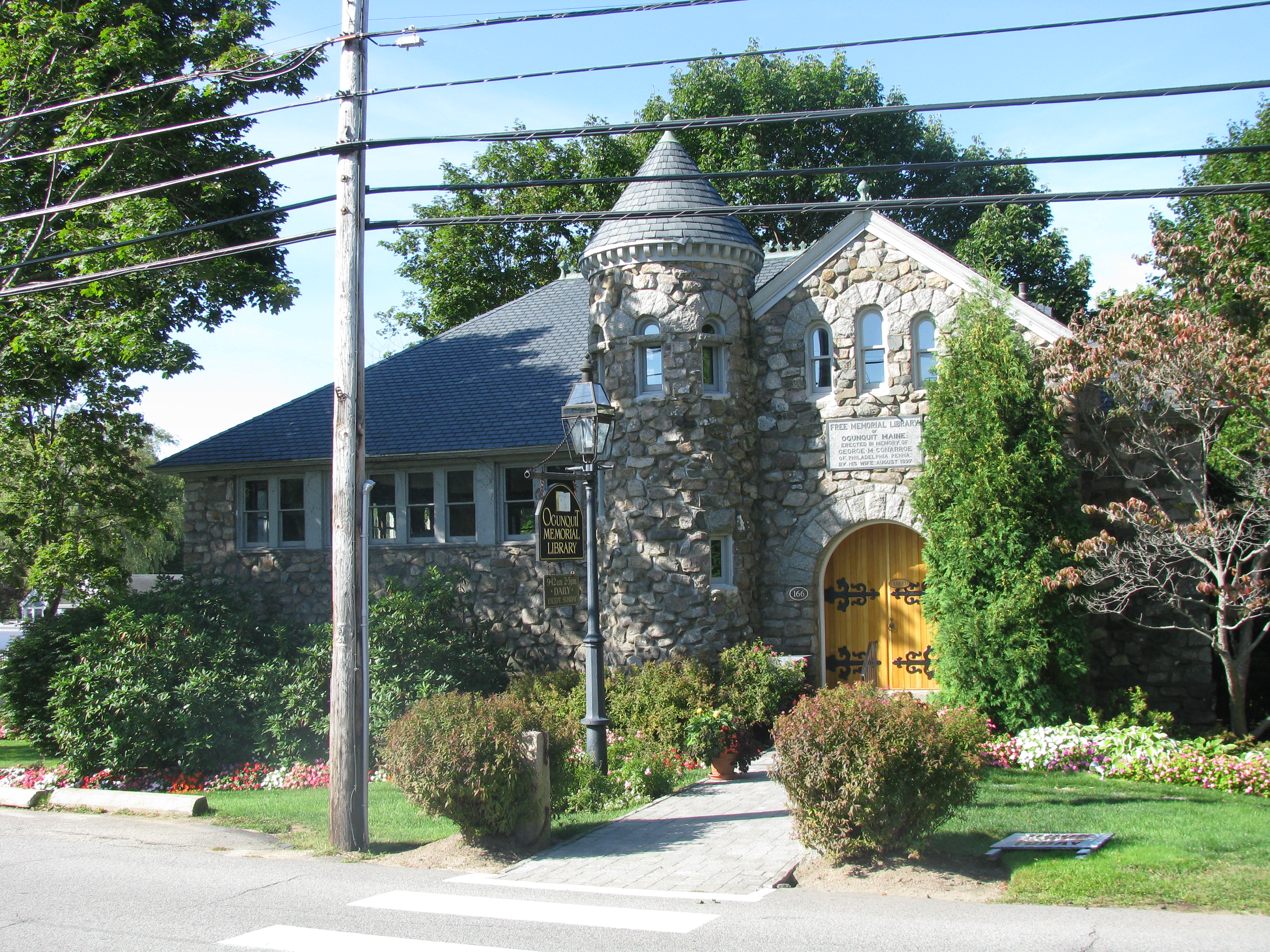

- Location within Maine Location within the United States
- Location: 166 Shore Rd., Ogunquit, Maine
- Coordinates: 43°14′42″N 70°35′52″W
- Area: 0.3 acres (0.12 ha)
- Built: 1897
- Architect: John M. Burns Jr., Henry A. Macomb
- Architectural style: Romanesque Revival
- NRHP reference No.: 83003706
- Added to NRHP: December 29, 1983

The Ogunquit Memorial Library is the public library of Ogunquit, Maine. It is located at 166 Shore Road, in an architecturally distinguished Romanesque Revival building built in 1897 and listed on the National Register of Historic Places in 1983. It was a gift to the town by Mrs. George Conarroe in honor of her husband.

== Architecture and history ==
The Ogunquit Memorial Library is located on the west side of Shore Road in central Ogunquit, in an area with many seaside resort accommodations. It is a rectangular building, fashioned out randomly course fieldstone, with a hip roof and a projecting gabled entrance. At one corner of the entrance stands an engaged circular staircase tower with a conical roof above a molded cornice. Eyebrow dormers project from some of the roof elevations. The interior is well-preserved, its original features including a large fireplace that was at first its sole heat source.

The library was built in 1897 to a design by Philadelphia architect John M. Burns, and is one of the finest examples of Richardsonian Romanesque architecture in southern Maine. The building was enlarged in 1914 to a design by Henry A. Macomb, also of Philadelphia; the quality of design and execution make it virtually impossible to distinguish the addition from the original. The library was the gift of Philadelphia resident Mrs. George Conarroe in honor of her husband.

== See also ==
- National Register of Historic Places listings in York County, Maine
