= Ogunquit, Maine =

- Town
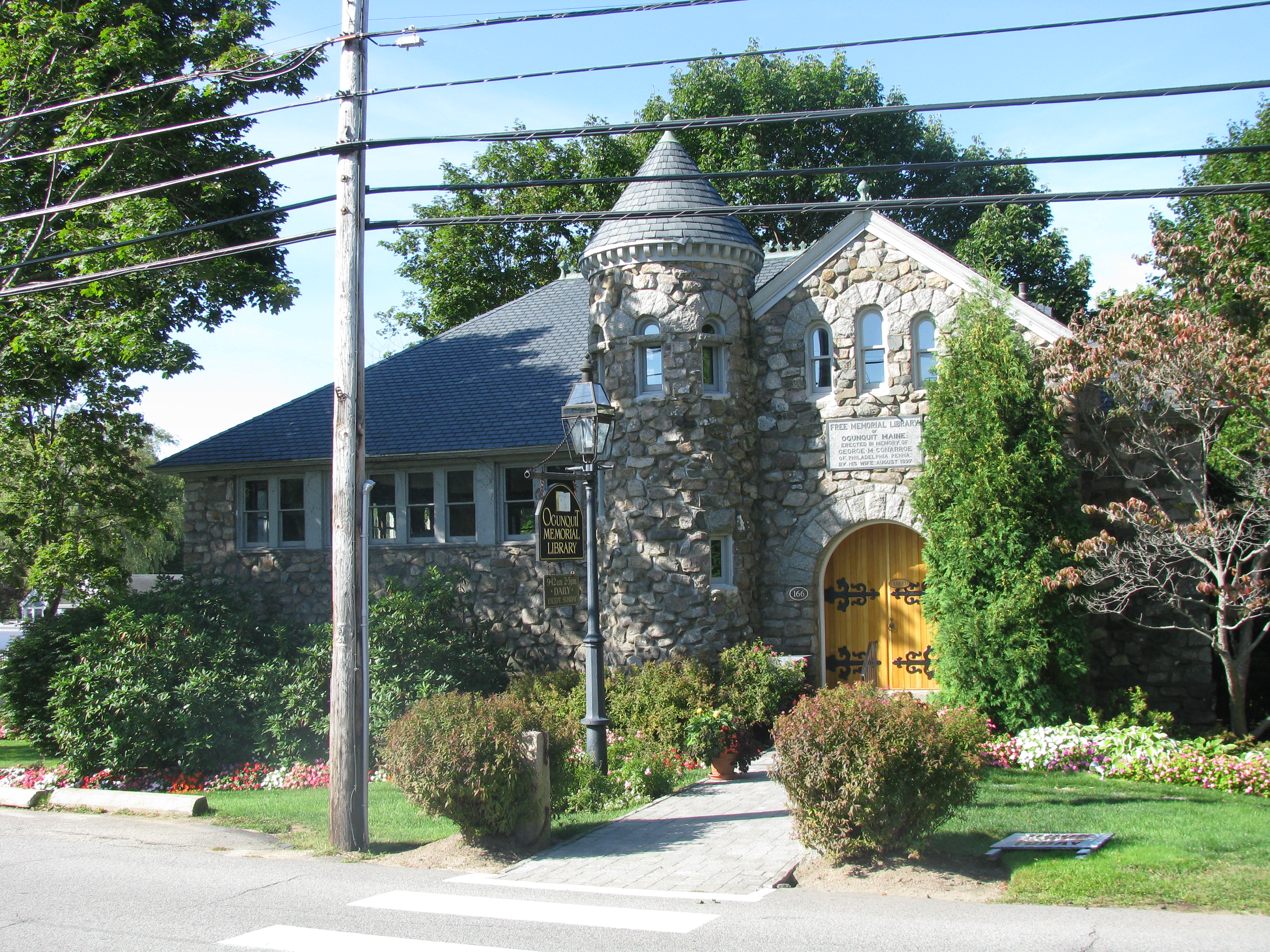
- Ogunquit Public Library

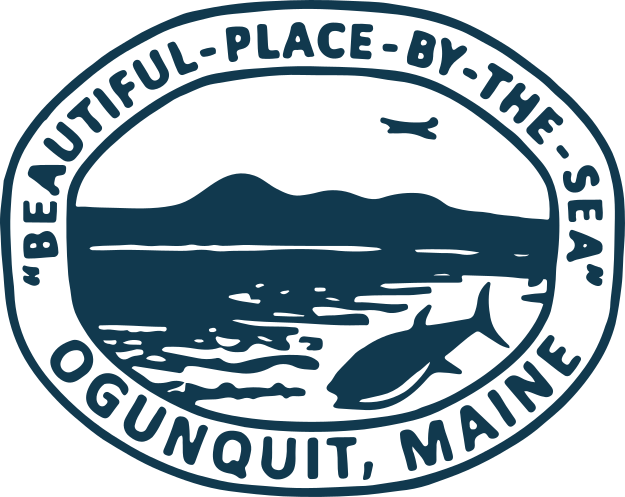
- Seal

- Location within the state of Maine
- Coordinates: 43°15′11″N 70°36′27″W
- Country: United States
- State: Maine
- County: York
- Incorporated: 1980

Area
  - Total: 15.25 sq mi (39.50 km^{2})
  - Land: 4.18 sq mi (10.83 km^{2})
  - Water: 11.07 sq mi (28.67 km^{2})
- Elevation: 30 ft (9.1 m)

Population (2020)
  - Total: 1,577
  - Density: 377/sq mi (145.6/km^{2})
- Time zone: UTC−5 (Eastern (EST))
  - Summer (DST): UTC−4 (EDT)
- ZIP Code: 03907
- Area code: 207
- FIPS code: 23-54980
- GNIS feature ID: 572671
- Website: www.ogunquit.gov

Perkins Cove fishing boat

Ogunquit (/oʊˈɡʌŋkwɪt/ oh-GUNG-kwit) is a resort town in York County, Maine, United States. As of the 2020 census, its population was 1,577. Ogunquit is part of the Portland–South Portland–Biddeford metropolitan area.

== History ==
Ogunquit was first a village within Wells, which was settled by colonists in 1641. The first sawmill was established in 1686, and shipbuilding developed along the tidal Ogunquit River. Local shipwrights built schooners, brigs and dories.

At what was then called Fish Cove, near the unnavigable Josias River, fishing was a major livelihood. But the cove was unprotected by a headland or breakwater from Atlantic storms, so fishermen had to protect their boats by hauling them ashore each night. Resolving to create a safe anchorage, they formed the Fish Cove Harbor Association, and dug a channel across land they purchased to connect Fish Cove with the Josias River. When the trench was complete, erosion helped to further widen the passage. The resulting tidewater basin is called Perkins Cove, spanned by a wooden double leafed pedestrian draw bridge, a notable attraction for visitors. With a one and a half-mile beach of fine pale sand and dunes forming a barrier peninsula, connected to the mainland in 1888 by bridge across the Ogunquit River, the village was discovered by artists. It became a popular art colony and tourist area. Particularly after 1898, when the Ogunquit Art Colony was established, it was not unusual to see both artists and fishermen working around Perkins Cove. As the summer crowds grew larger, several seaside hotels and inns were built. Marginal Way, a scenic trail dating back to the 1920s, runs along the coast from Perkins Cove to Ogunquit Beach. Ogunquit seceded from Wells in 1980 and was incorporated as an independent town. Ogunquit was named America's Best Coastal Small Town in USA Today's 10 Best Readers' Choice 2016.

Ogunquit is a destination for LGBT tourists, with numerous LGBT-owned and operated hotels, restaurants, bars, theaters, and other businesses. Most of the LGBT oriented businesses are in the village area of the town.

The main beach is a highlight for most visitors as well as the local residents who also enjoy walking on the beach throughout the year.

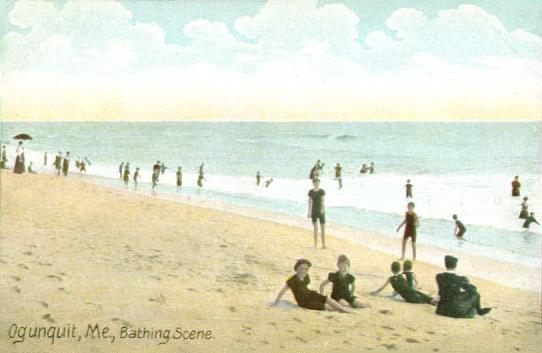
Ogunquit Beach c. 1910

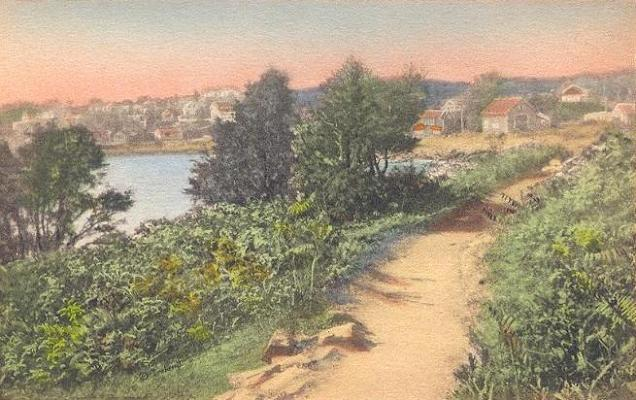
Perkins Cove from Marginal Way c. 1920

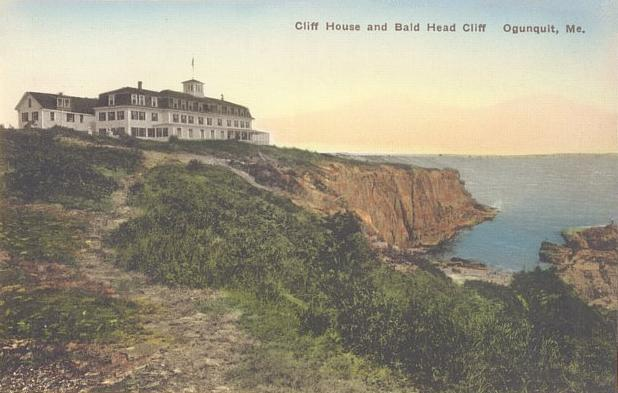
The Cliff House c. 1920

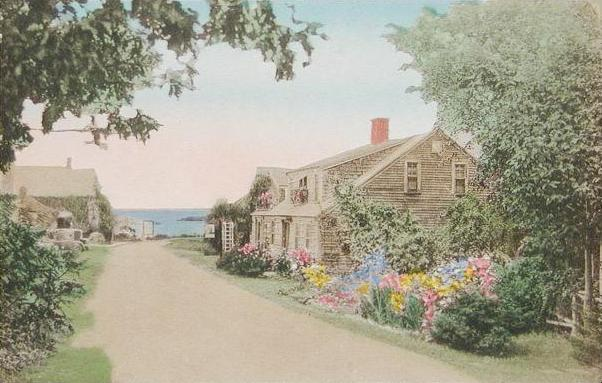
Perkins Cove Road c. 1920

== Geography ==
According to the United States Census Bureau, the town has a total area of 15.25 square miles (39.50 km^{2}), of which 4.18 square miles (10.83 km^{2}) is land and 11.07 square miles (28.67 km^{2}) is water. Ogunquit is drained by the Josias and Ogunquit Rivers. The highest elevation in town is just over 160 feet (49 m) above sea level, in several locations. The lowest elevation is sea level, along the Atlantic Ocean coastline.

Acidic, stony-loam or sandy-loam glacial till soils of the Lyman series underlie most of Ogunquit. There also are outwash sands of the Adams or Croghan series. All of these soils have classic podzol profile development in undisturbed areas.

Ogunquit's Marginal Way, a 1.25-mile (2 km) trail with views of the coast, is neatly paved, and the treacherous cliffs are, in places, fenced. The path leads from a Shore Road access point to Perkins Cove. Marginal Way was added to the National Register of Historic Places in 2022.

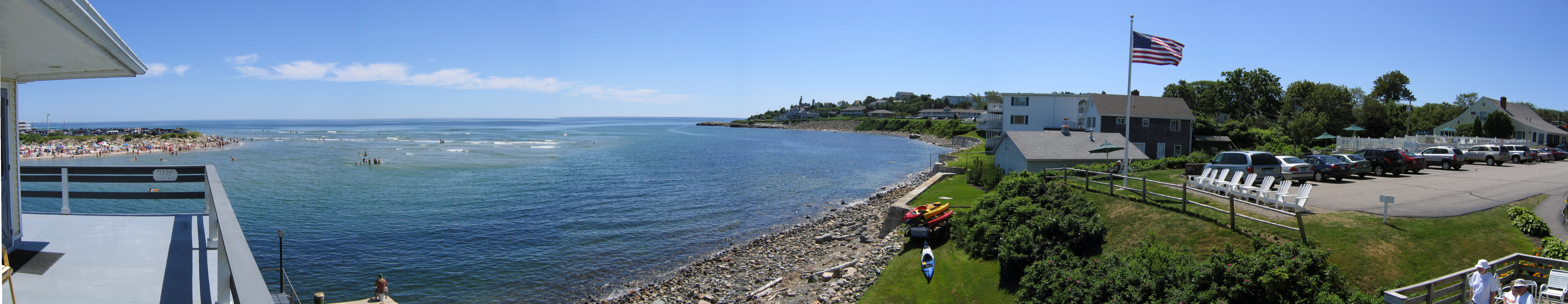
Ogunquit River at high tide in August 2006.
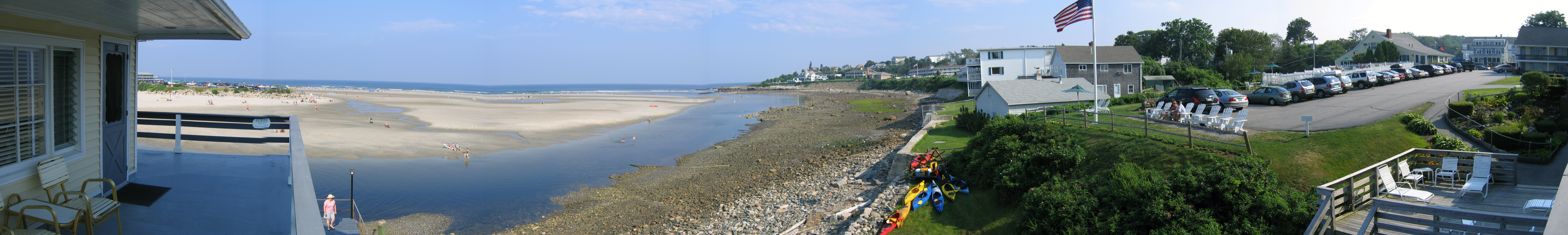
Ogunquit River at low tide the same month. Ogunquit's beach nearly disappears at high tide.
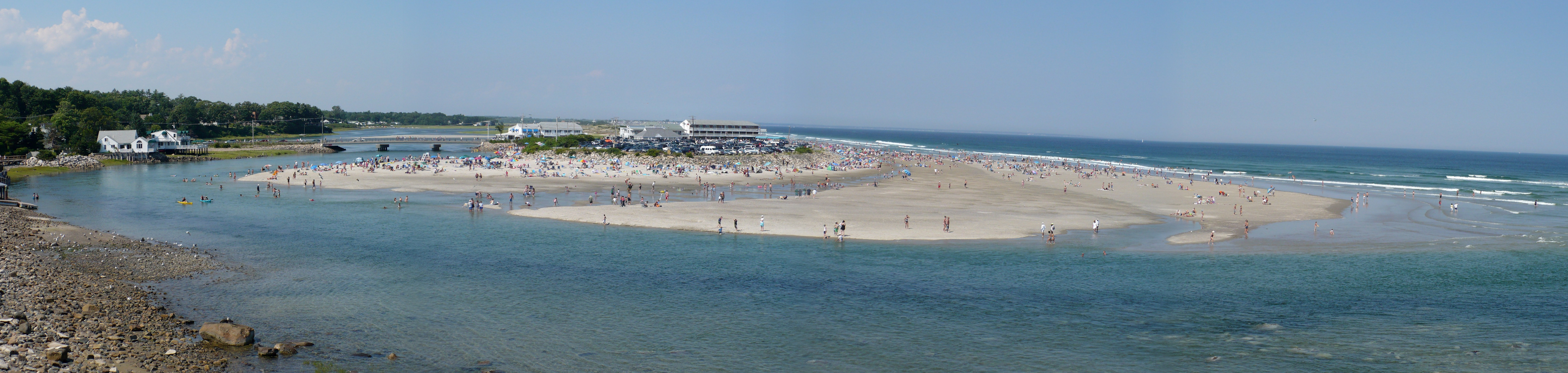
The Ogunquit River exits the Rachel Carson Preserve from the left and flows into colder waters of the Gulf of Maine.

=== Climate ===
This climatic region is typified by large seasonal temperature differences, with warm to hot (and often humid) summers and cold (sometimes severely cold) winters. According to the Köppen Climate Classification system, Ogunquit has a humid continental climate, abbreviated "Dfb" on climate maps.

== Demographics ==
Historical population
Census	Pop.	Note	%±
1970	944		—
1980	1,492		58.1%
1990	974		−34.7%
2000	1,226		25.9%
2010	892		−27.2%
2020	1,577		76.8%
U.S. Decennial Census

As of 2000 the median income for a household in the town was $47,727, and the median income for a family was $56,731. Males had a median income of $44,583 versus $31,528 for females. The per capita income for the town was $34,289. About 1.2% of families and 4.2% of the population were below the poverty line, including 4.6% of those under age 18 and 3.7% of those age 65 or over.

=== 2010 census ===
As of the census of 2010, there were 892 people, 498 households, and 234 families residing in the town. The population density was 213.4 inhabitants per square mile (82.4/km^{2}). There were 2,009 housing units at an average density of 480.6 per square mile (185.6/km^{2}). The racial makeup of the town was 97.0% White, 0.1% African American, 0.1% Native American, 1.0% Asian, 0.4% from other races, and 1.3% from two or more races. Hispanic or Latino of any race were 1.5% of the population.

There were 498 households, of which 8.6% had children under the age of 18 living with them, 42.0% were married couples living together, 4.0% had a female householder with no husband present, 1.0% had a male householder with no wife present, and 53.0% were non-families. Of all households, 41.2% were made up of individuals, and 20.9% had someone living alone who was 65 years of age or older. The average household size was 1.79 and the average family size was 2.37.

The median age in the town was 61.7 years. Of the residents, 7.6% were under the age of 18; 2.5% were between the ages of 18 and 24; 13.6% were from 25 to 44; 34% were from 45 to 64; and 42.4% were 65 years of age or older. The gender makeup of the town was 50.1% male and 49.9% female.

== Education ==
The Wells-Ogunquit Community School District is the public school system that provides education from Kindergarten through high school for those who reside in Wells and Ogunquit. The schools are located in Wells and none in Ogunquit since the former Ogunquit Village School was closed by the WOCSD in 2004, and the building abandoned. The building was demolished in 2024 to make way for a $12 million dollar Ogunquit municipal campus which includes a police station, town hall, and a basketball court.

== Cultural sites and museums ==
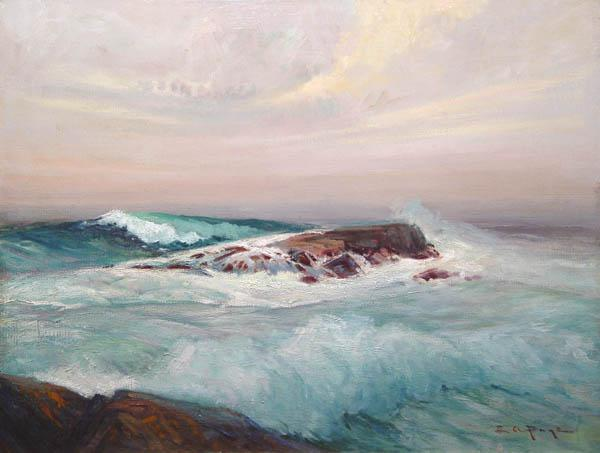
Surf at Ogunquit, Maine by Edward A. Page (c. 1911)

- Barn Gallery | Ogunquit Art Association (est 1928)
- Historical Society of Wells and Ogunquit (1862) (located in Wells)
- Ogunquit Museum of American Art
- Ogunquit Playhouse
- Captain James Winn House (c. 1785)
- Ogunquit Memorial Library

== Notable people ==
- Clarence H. Adams, commissioner of the U.S. Securities and Exchange Commission
- Marjorie Agosín, poet and professor at Wellesley College
- Edward H. and Gladys G. Aschermann, early 20th century designers
- John Kendrick Bangs, author
- Mountfort Coolidge, painter and antiquarian
- Bobby Coombs, Major League Baseball pitcher
- Joseph B. Davol, marine painter and art teacher
- Nathan Haskell Dole, author
- Totie Fields, actress/comedian
- Arnie Ginsburg, radio personality
- Channing Hare, painter
- Peter George Olenchuk, former summer resident, U.S. Army Major General
- J. Scott Smart, radio, film and stage actor
- Sally Struthers, actress
- Craig Timberlake, resident, stage actor, singer, author, and educator
- John Grimes Walker, admiral in the United States Navy
- Bob Winn, resident, long distance runner and local politician
- Charles Herbert Woodbury, artist

== Gallery ==
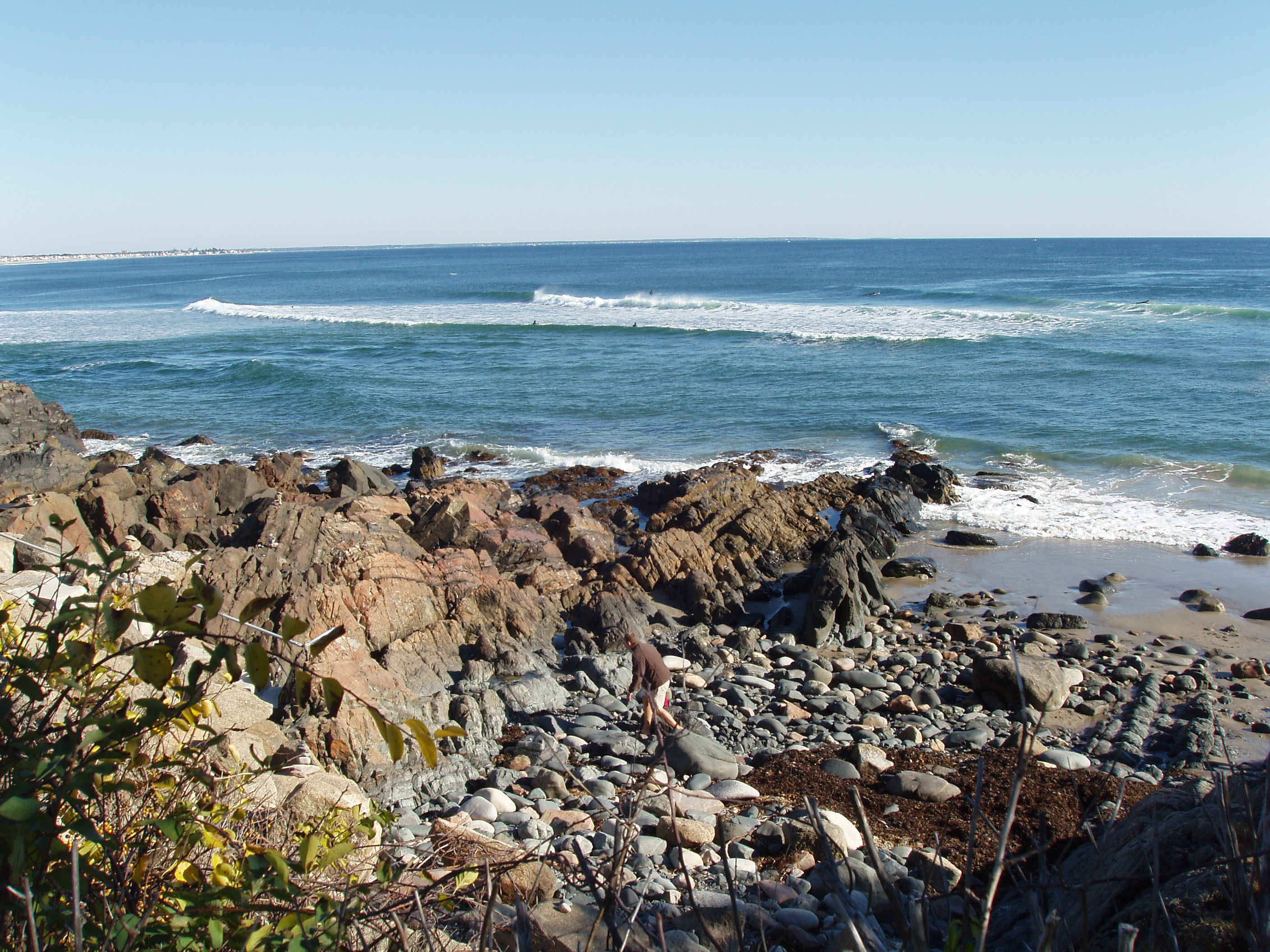
The beach along the Marginal Way, 2008

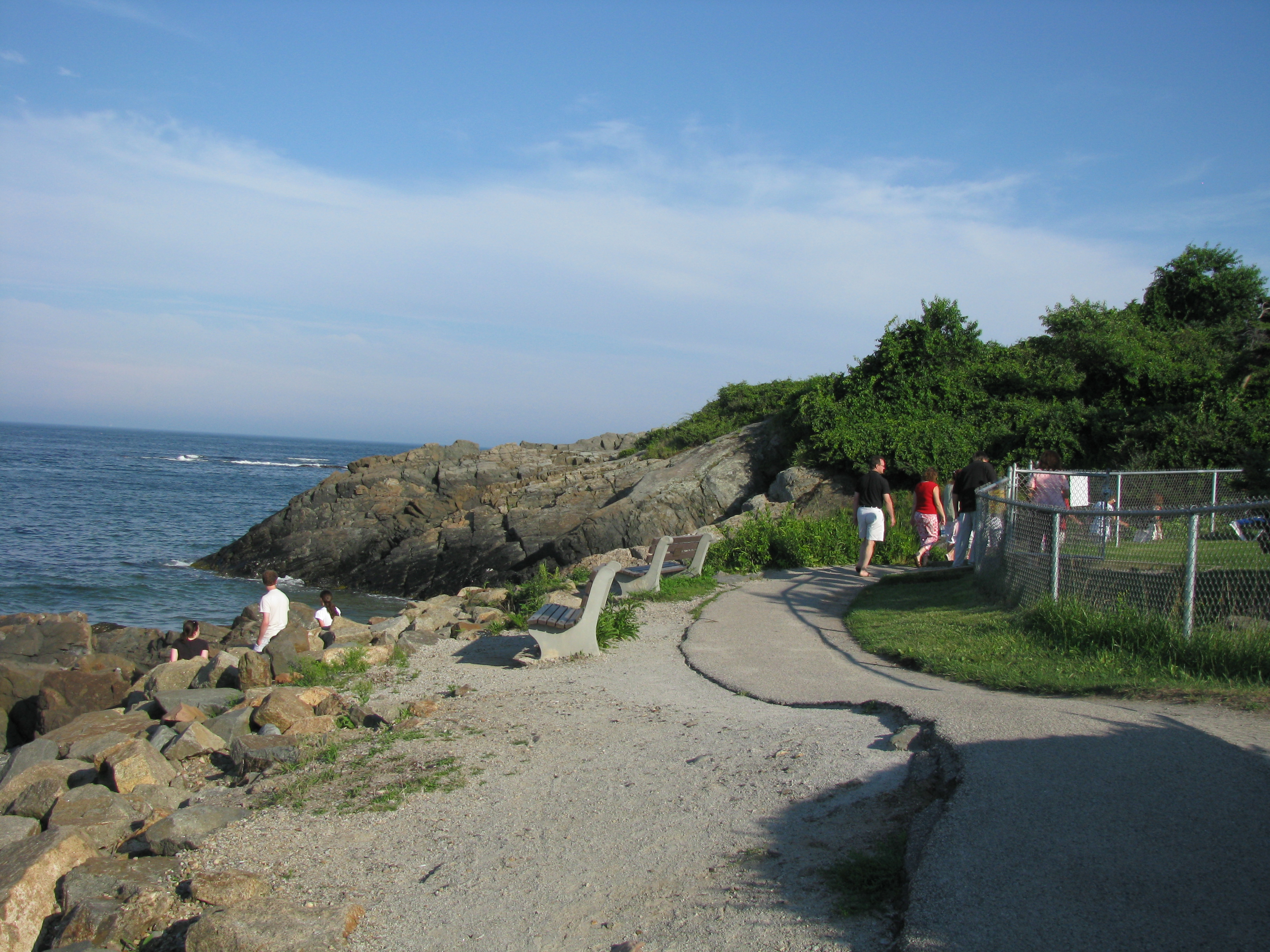
The Marginal Way near the Beachmere Hotel, 2008

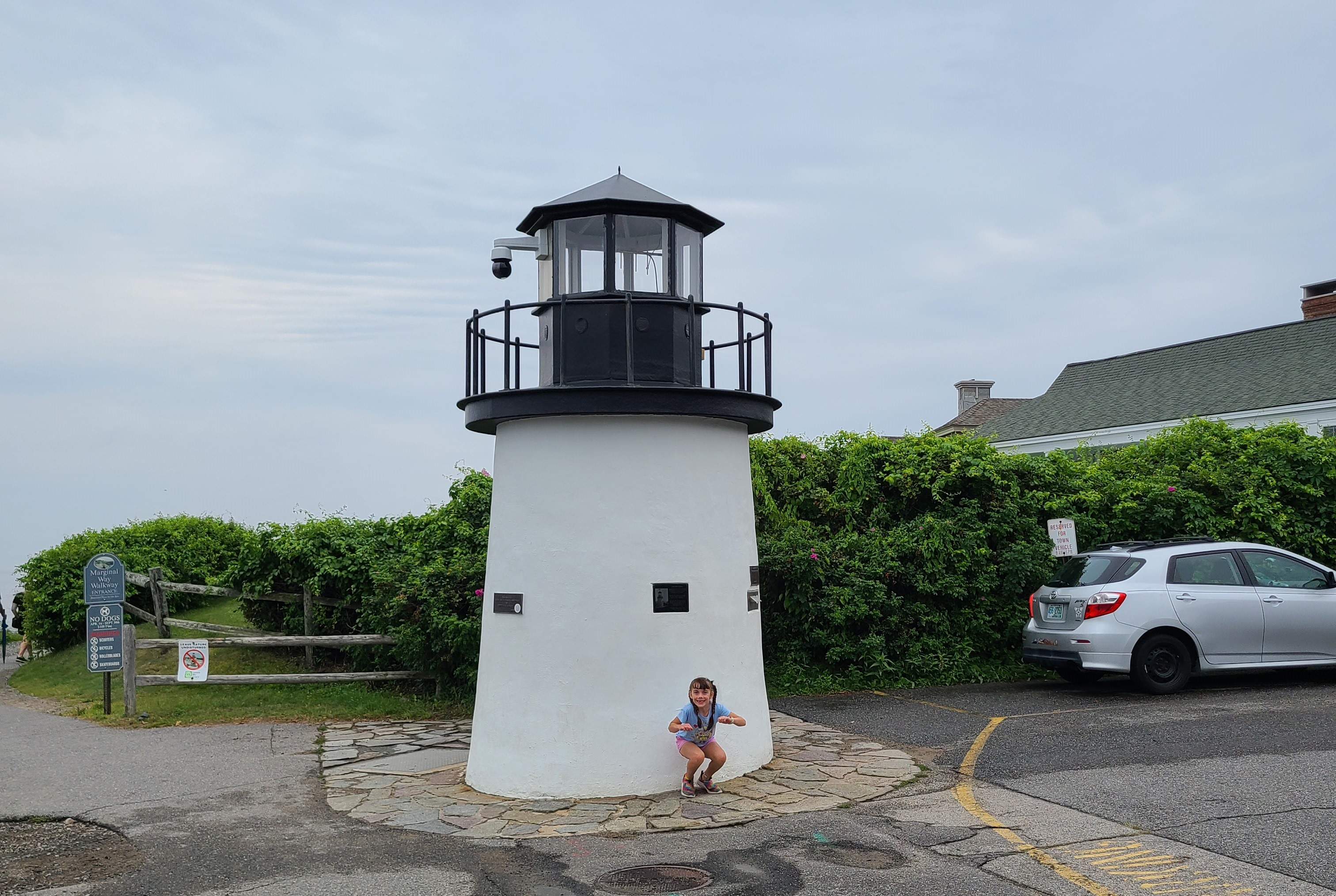
Lobster Point Lighthouse found along Marginal Way

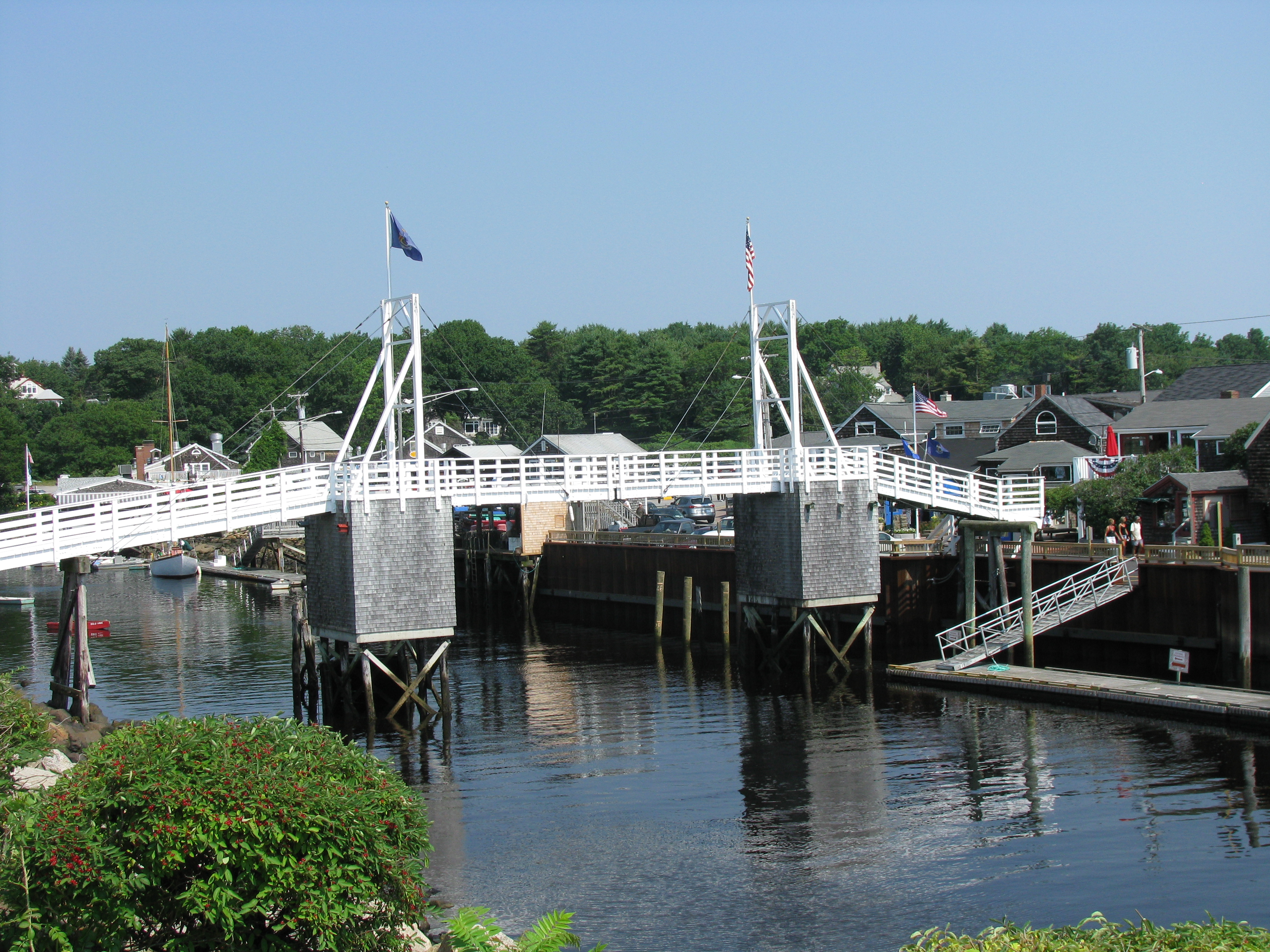
The bridge at Perkins Cove, 2008

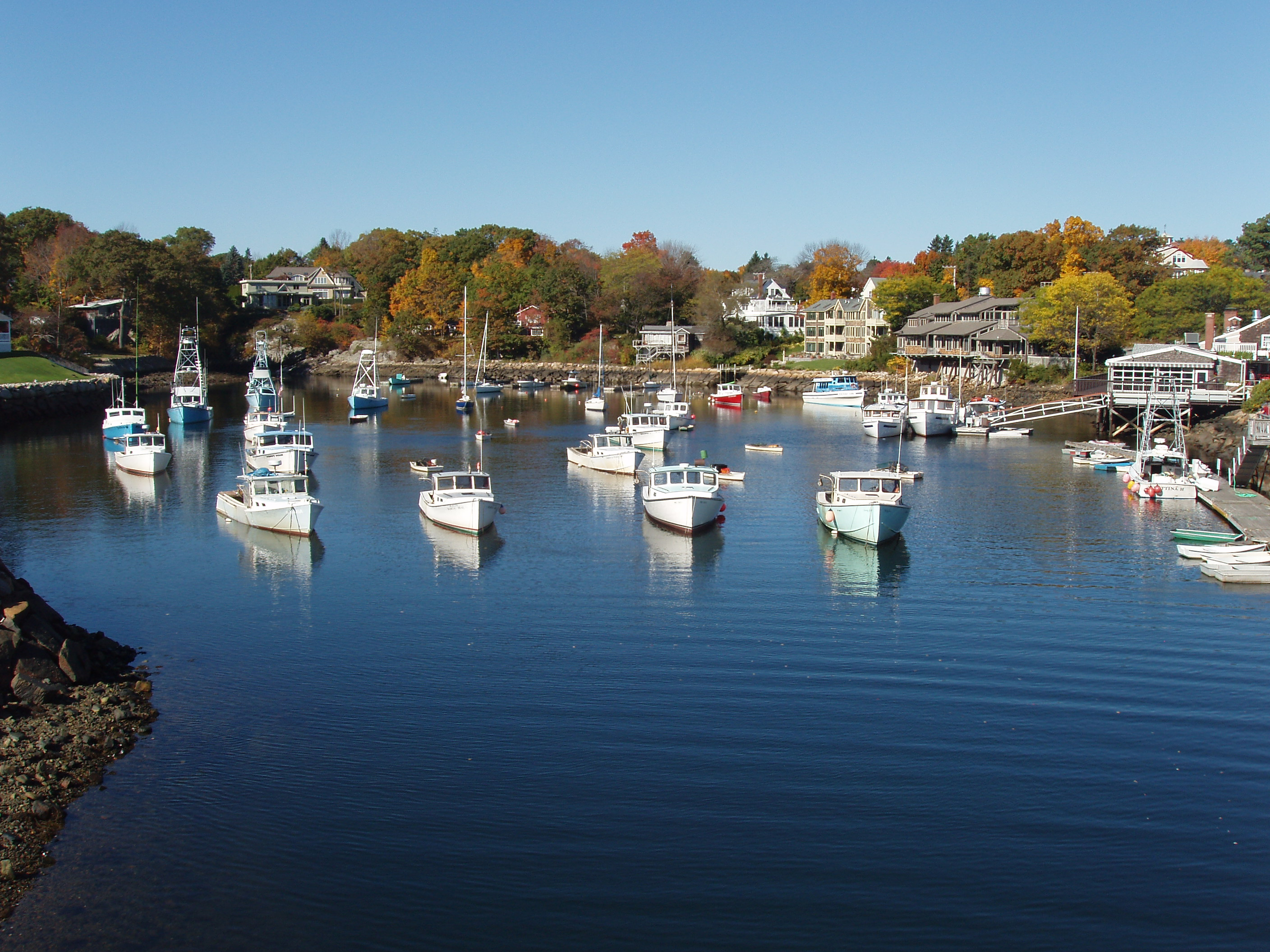
View from the Bridge at Perkins Cove, 2007

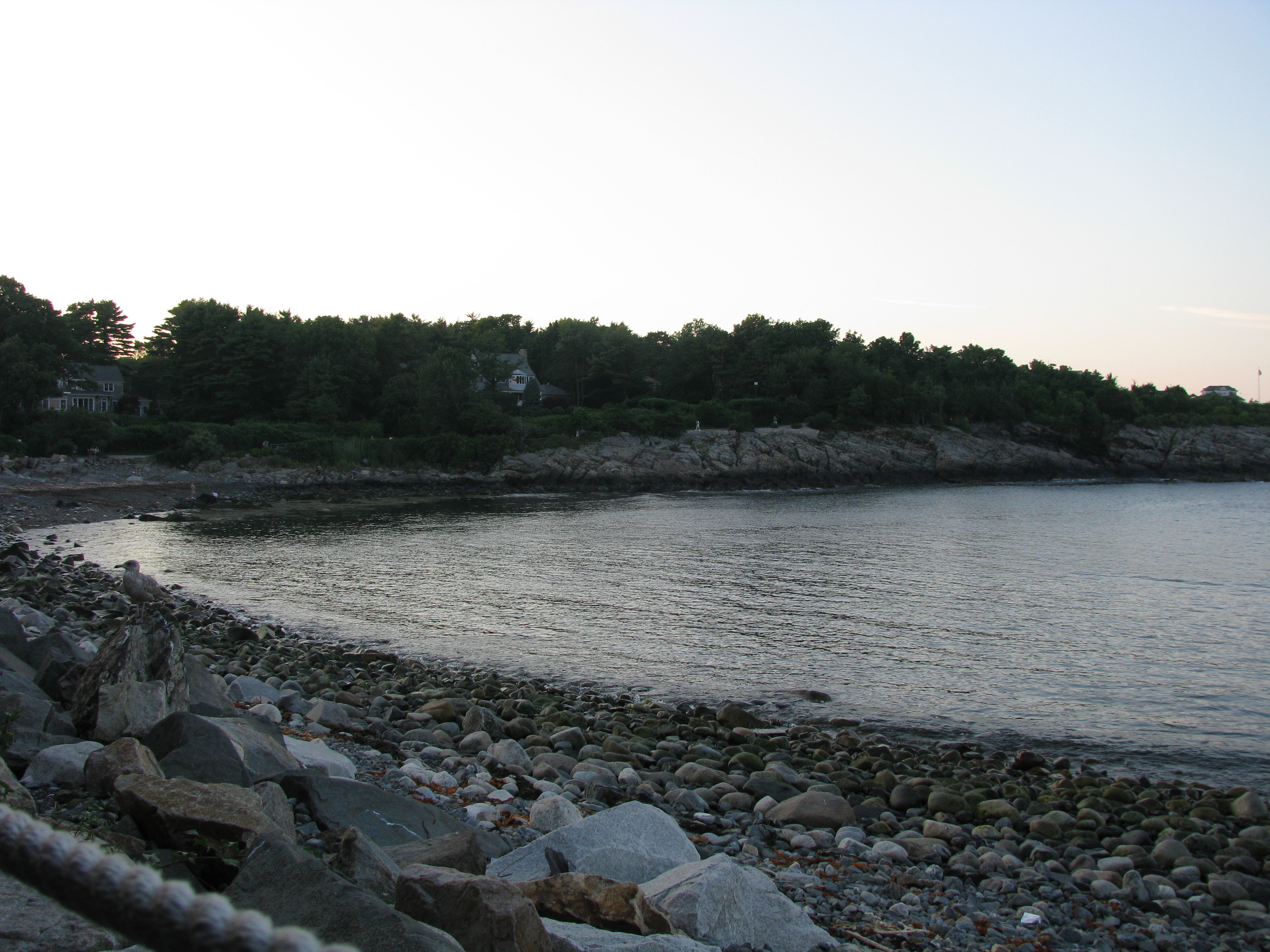
The beach at Perkins Cove looking toward the Marginal Way, 2008

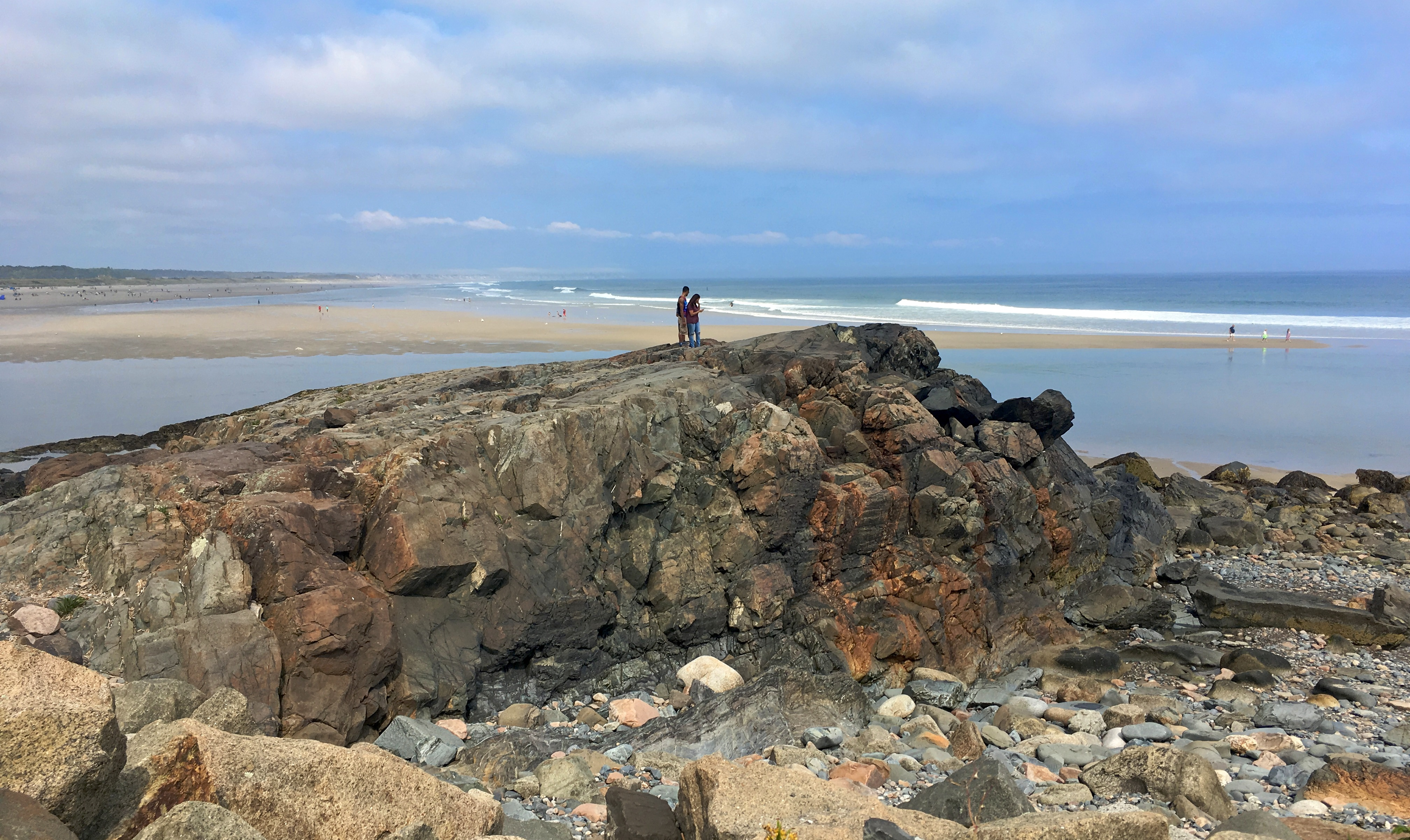
Rock formation at Marginal Way

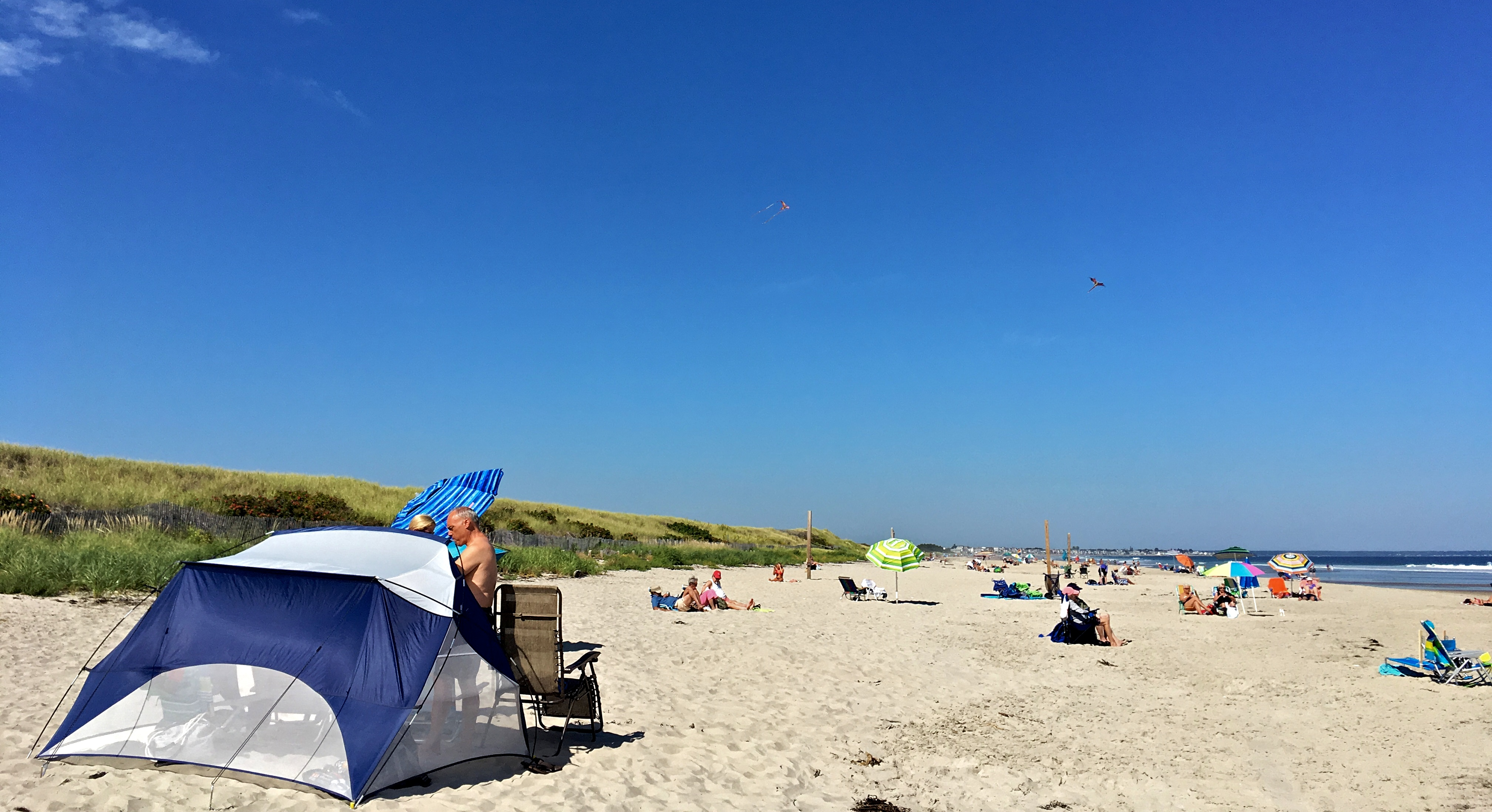
Kites flown at Ogunquit Beach

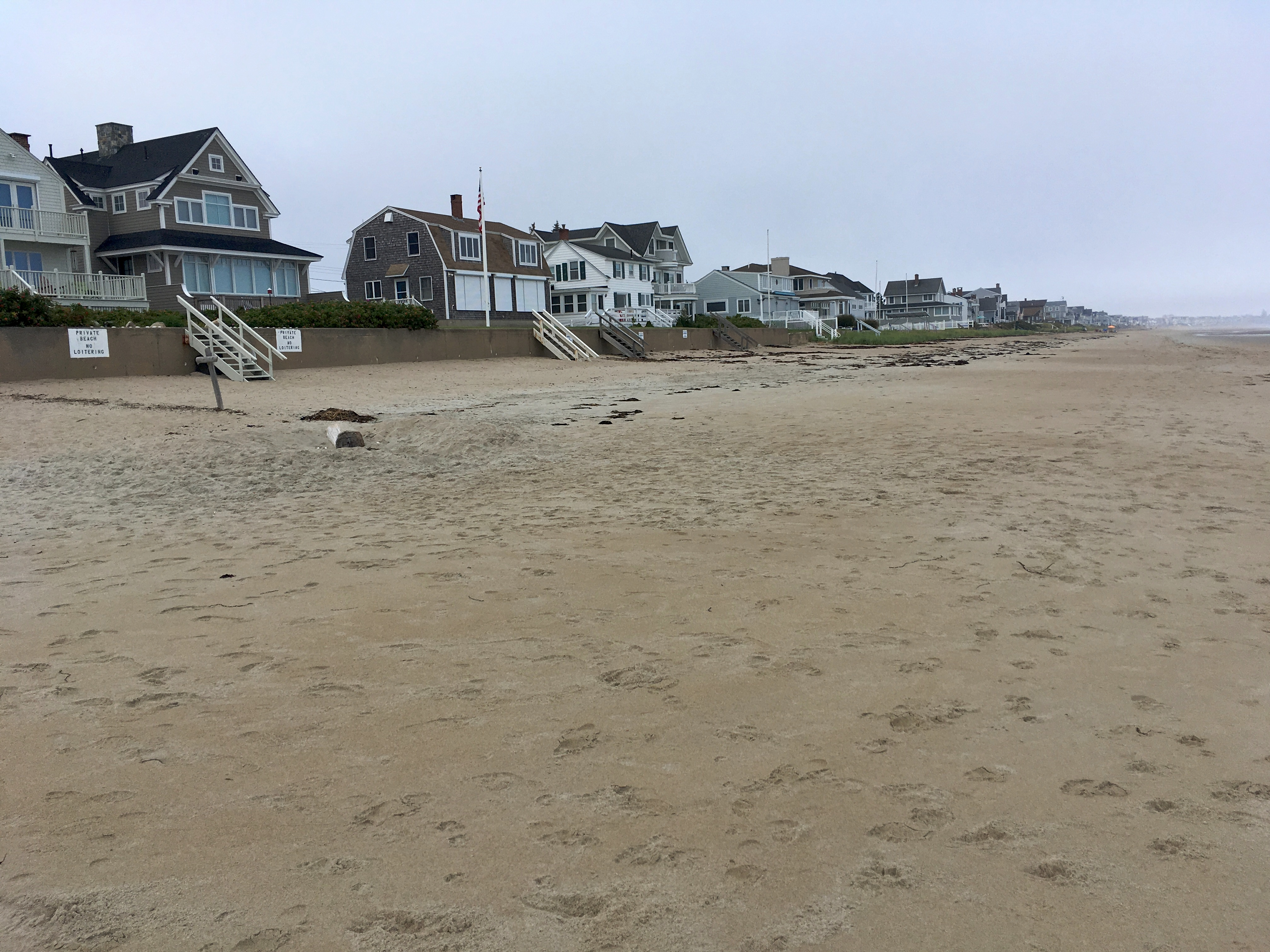
Moody Beach

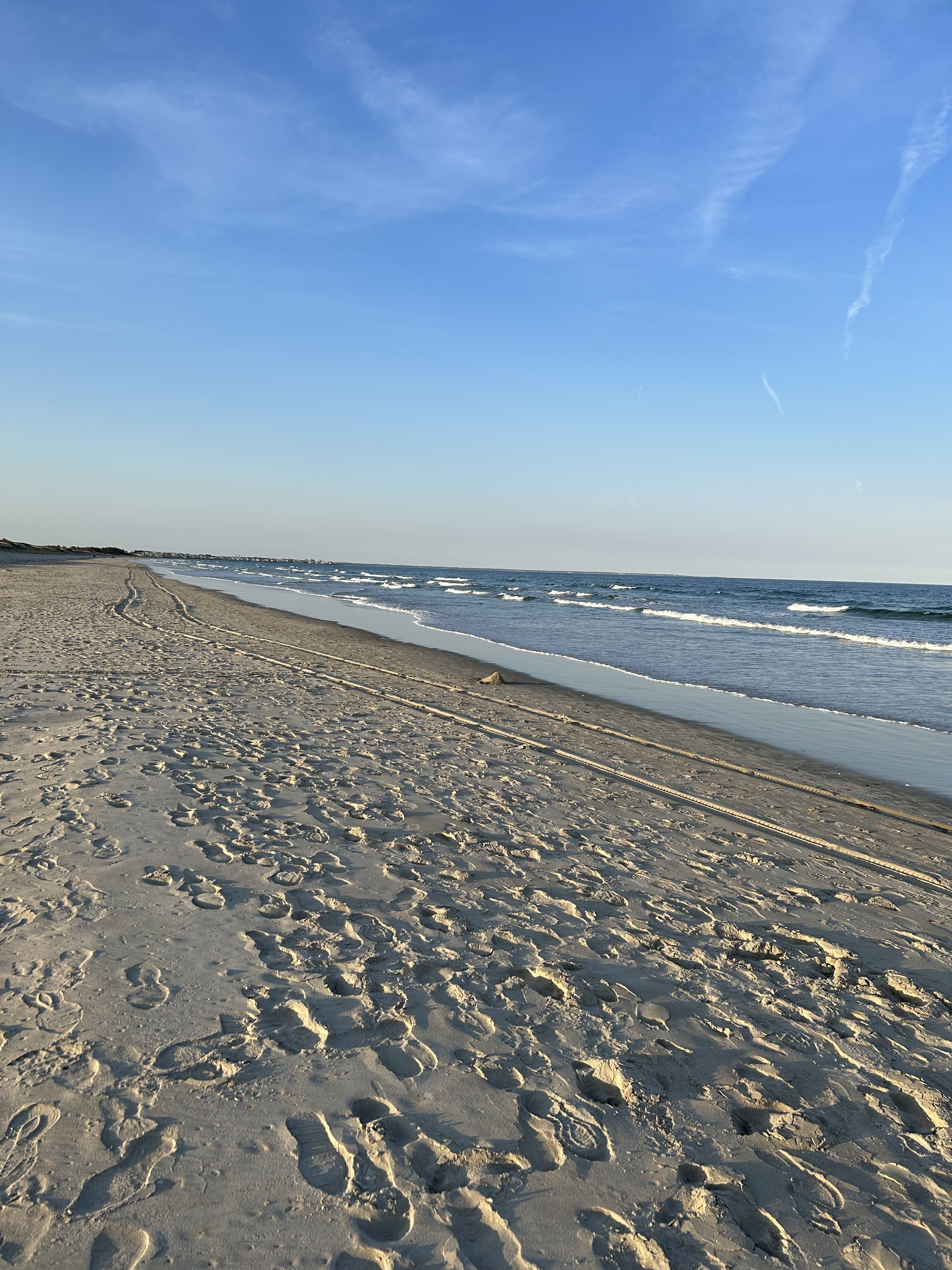
Ogunquit Beach in April 2023

== Trivia ==
Ogunquit Beach is the name of a geologic unit on Mars which was once underwater or on the shore of an ancient lake.

Part of Stephen King's The Stand, published in 1978, is set in Ogunquit. The first episode of the 2020 miniseries adaptation is set in the town, though the series was filmed in Vancouver.
