= Avant =

Avant can refer to:

== People ==
- Avant, part of music production team Bloodshy & Avant
- Avant (singer), Myron Avant, an American singer
- Clarence Avant, a music executive
- Jason Avant, is a US American football player
- Lloyd Avant (born 2006), American football player

== Places ==
- Avant, Oklahoma, United States
- The Avant, a high-rise in Buffalo, New York, United States
- Dew, Texas, an unincorporated community (former name)

== Technology ==
=== Computing ===
- Avant Window Navigator, computer software
- Avanti Corporation, whose name is often written “Avant!”

=== Transport ===
- Avant (airline), a former airline that operated flights within Chile in the late 1990s
- Avant (train), a high speed rail service in Spain
- Audi Avant, a station wagon
- Audi RS2 Avant, a high performance estate car
- Citroën Traction Avant, a 1930s saloon car

== Music ==
- Avant-pop
- Avant-punk
- Avant-prog
- Avant-rock
- Avant Hard, an album by Add N to (X)
- Avant Records, a former Japanese record label founded by John Zorn

== Other ==
- Avant (company), an online personal loan lender located in downtown Chicago
- Avant (journal), an academic interdisciplinary studies and philosophy of science journal
- AVANT, an American art collective

== See also ==
- Avant-garde (disambiguation)
- Avante (disambiguation)
