= Pop art (disambiguation) =

Pop art is a visual art movement that emerged in the 1950s in Britain and the United States.

Pop art may also refer to:

- PopArt: The Hits, an album by the UK electronic music duo Pet Shop Boys
- Pop Art (album), the debut album from UK pop/rock band Transvision Vamp
- "Pop Art" (short story), a short story by an American author, Joe Hill
- Pop Art, the debut album by UK pop musician MPHO

== See also ==
- Art pop (disambiguation)
- Pop Hart (George Overbury Hart), 1868–1933, American painter
