= Between the Lines =

Between the Lines may refer to:

== Film and television ==
- Between the Lines (1977 film), a comedy directed by Joan Micklin Silver
- Between the Lines (2008 film), a documentary film
- Between the Lines (TV series), a 1990s British police drama
- Between the Lines (game show), a 2011 Australian game show

== Music ==
=== Albums ===
- Between the Lines (Chemistry album)
- Between the Lines (Five Star album)
- Between the Lines (Janis Ian album)
- Between the Lines (Jason Donovan album)
- Between the Lines, 2019 album featuring Australian jazz trio Trichotomy with Danny Widdicombe as vocalist

=== Songs ===
- "Between the Lines" (Evermore song)
- "Between the Lines" (Stone Temple Pilots song)
- "Between the Lines", a song by Andrew Hyatt
- "Between the Lines", a song by Bloom 06 from Crash Test 02
- "Between the Lines", a song by Robyn from Honey
- "Between the Lines", a song by Sara Bareilles from Little Voice
- "Between the Lines", a song by Pink Fairies

== Publications ==
- Between the Lines Books, a Canadian publisher
- Between the Lines (novel), a 2011 novel by Jodi Picoult and Samantha Van Leer
  - Between the Lines (musical), a musical based on the novel
- Between the Lines: Nine Things Baseball Taught Me About Life, a book by Orel Hershiser
- Between the Lines (newspaper), a Michigan LGBT newspaper

== See also ==
- Between the Lies, a 2010 EP by Memphis May Fire
- Between the Lions, an American children's television series
- Read Between the Lines (disambiguation)
