= Yves Martin =

Canadian sociologist (1929–2021)

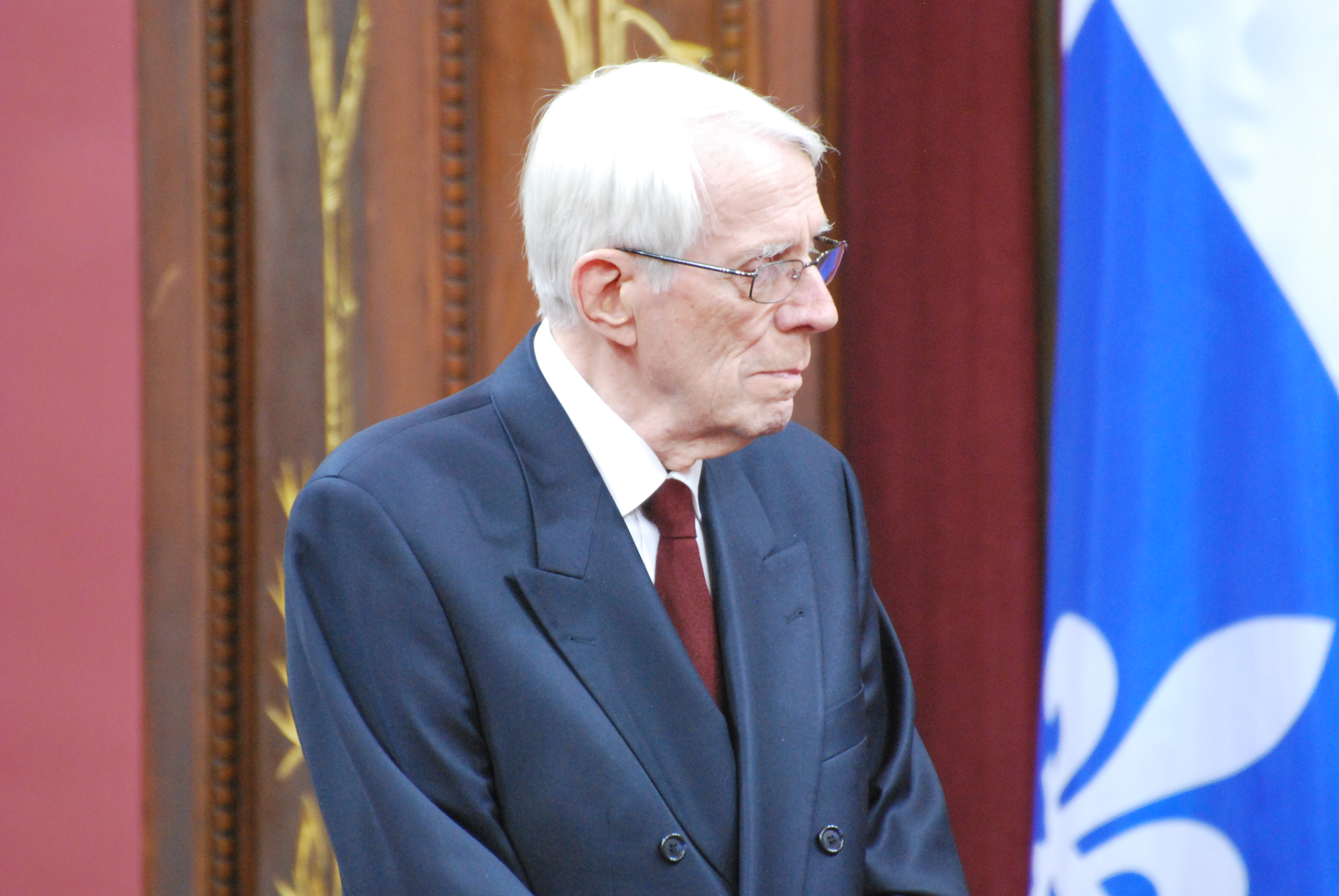
- Martin in 2013
- Born: 22 November 1929; Lachine, Quebec, Canada
- Died: 23 February 2021 (aged 91)
- Occupation: Sociologist

Yves Martin OQ (22 November 1929 – 23 February 2021) was a Canadian sociologist. He was the laity rector at the Université de Sherbrooke and was one of the founders of the Institut de recherche Robert-Sauvé en santé et en sécurité du travail.

== Biography ==
Martin studied at the Séminaire Saint-Charles-Borromée de Sherbrooke from 1943 to 1949. He studied in university in Quebec City and Paris. From 1956 to 1964, he was a sociology and anthropology professor at Université Laval and was one of the co-founders of the journal Recherches sociographiques in 1960. In 1964, he became Secretary of the Association canadienne des anthropologues, psychologues sociaux et sociologues de langue française. In 1966, he became Assistant Deputy Minister of the Quebec Ministry of Education and Higher Education. He was promoted to Deputy Minister in 1969. In 1973, he became Director General of the Régie de l'assurance maladie du Québec. From 1975 to 1981, he was laity rector at the Université de Sherbrooke.

Yves Martin died on 23 February 2021 at the age of 91.

== Distinctions ==
- Doctor honoris causa of the University of Caen Normandy (1979)
- Médaille Georges-Henri-Lévesque (2009)
- Officer of the National Order of Quebec (2013)
- Doctor honoris causa of the Université du Québec (2018)
