= Avant-pop (disambiguation) =

Avant-pop or avantpop may refer to:

- Avant-pop, a form of popular music
- Avant-pop (artistic movement), an American art movement derived from postmodernism
  - Avant-Pop: Fiction for a Daydream Nation, a related book
- Avant Pop, 1986 album by Lester Bowie

== See also ==
- Avant-garde (disambiguation)
- Experimental pop
- Art pop (disambiguation)
