= Read between the lines =

"Read between the lines" is an English idiom for inferring a deeper or hidden meaning in a text or a statement, beyond what is explicitly stated.

Read between the lines or Read Between the Lines may also refer to:

== Music ==
=== Albums and videos ===
- Read Between the Lines (Aaron Tippin album) or the title song, 1992
- Read Between the Lines (KSM album) or the title song, 2009
- Read Between the Lines, by Avantgarde, 2005
- Read Between the Lines, a video by Boys Like Girls, 2008

=== Songs ===
- "Read Between the Lines" (song), by Lynn Anderson, 1987
- "Read Between the Lines", by Aaliyah from Aaliyah, 2001
- "Read Between the Lines", by Carole King from the 1982 album One to One
- "Read Between the Lines", by Dave Melillo, 2008
- "Read Between the Lines", by Deana Martin, 2013
- "Read Between the Lines", by Five Star from the 1987 album Between the Lines, 1987
- "Read Between the Lines", by the Fixx from the 1986 album Walkabout
- "Read Between the Lines", by Jerusalem from the 1983 album Vi Kan Inte Stoppas (Can't Stop Us Now)
- "Read Between the Lines", by Monie Love from the 1990 album Down to Earth
- "Read Between the Lines", by Rebbie Jackson from the 1988 album R U Tuff Enuff
- "Read Between the Lines", by Tim Feehan, 1984
- "Read Between the Lines", a song by Tom Cardy from the 2021 EP Artificial Intelligence

== Television ==
- "Read Between the Lines" (Cold Case), an episode
- "Read Between the Lines" (Duet), an episode
- "Read Between the Lines" (Sidekicks), an episode
- Read Between the Lines, a game on the educational series Braingames

== See also ==
- Between the Lines (disambiguation)
- Read Between the Lies, a novel by Lori Bryant-Woolridge
- "Read Between the Lies", a song by Slayer from South of Heaven
- Reed Between the Lines, an American television family sitcom
- Lining out, a form of hymn singing sometimes referred to as reading between the lines
