= Avant-Garde Computing =

Defunct American software company

Avant-Garde Computing, Inc.
- Industry: Software; Networking hardware
- Founded: 1978; 48 years ago
- Founders: Timothy P. Ahlstrom; F. Morgan LaMarche
- Defunct: 1990; 36 years ago
- Fate: Acquired by Boole & Babbage
- Headquarters: Mount Laurel, New Jersey, U.S.
- Products: Net/Adviser; Net/Alert; Net/Command; Net/Guard

Avant-Garde Computing, Inc. was a publicly traded American software and computer hardware company active from 1978 to 1990 and based in Mount Laurel, New Jersey. It was most well known for its Net/Command, Net/Adviser, Net/Alert, and Net/Guard suite of network management, monitoring, and security products. The company was acquired by Boole & Babbage in 1990 after a five-year string of losses.

== Beginning ==
Avant-Garde Computing was founded by Timothy P. Ahlstrom and F. Morgan LaMarche and incorporated in 1978. Ahlstrom and LaMarche were previously 20 year veterans of IBM, both working in that company's marketing department. In their off-time in the early 1970s, the duo built a device that would warn computer operators when a data tape was close to the end of its reel, founding Ahlstrom LaMarche & Co. to market it. The device proliferated rapidly in the computer rooms of various companies, and the duo later sold their company and its patents to Telegentics of Cherry Hill, New Jersey, to reportedly modest profit. After several years, the duo regrouped and discussed starting another business. They decided to invite several top executives of companies who ran large mainframe computer networks to dinner at a restaurant. When Ahlstrom and LaMarche asked them what troubles they frequently encountered, network management was cited as the most challenging task. These conversations inspired the duo to raise the capital to incorporate Avant-Garde Computing in Cherry Hill; in order to secure adequate financing, the two also put second mortgages on their homes.

The company's first product, Net/Alert, was announced in October 1979. It was a hardware–software network management suite comprising a light-pen-capable, color CRT monitor, logic analyzer, and graphical software to analyze traffic on a mainframe network and display and print reports based on the collected data. Net/Alert took two years to develop and was primarily the brainchild of Ahlstrom; LaMarche meanwhile possessed the marketing prowess. In the time between the product's development and their first sale, the duo sold a 45-percent stake of Avant-Garde Computing, worth US$500,000, to Northern Telecom's United States subsidiary in Nashville, Tennessee, in 1980. Northern Telecom U.S.'s Spectron division purchased the first Net/Alert units–worth $3.6 million—in January 1981. With the help of Spectron, Avant-Garde won clients such as Citibank, Xerox, Cigna, MetLife, Chase Manhattan Bank, Shearson/American Express, and Air France within two years of Net/Alert's introduction.

== Success ==
In June 1983, Avant-Garde went public, issuing 1.1 million shares of common stock. The proceeds from the company's initial public offering allowed the company to retire its debt and earn working capital. Soon after the IPO, Northern Telecom relinquished its 45-percent stake in Avant-Garde, pocketing $20 million in the process.

Sales and profits doubled for Avant-Garde between the last quarter of 1982 and the first quarter of 1983. In November 1983, Avant-Garde received a $1 million order for Net/Alert from Southern Bell, their largest order yet. This was followed up by a $3.8 million order from Merrill Lynch the next month. This sale alone was larger than Avant-Garde's entire second-quarter revenue earnings ($3.5 million). Avant-Garde ended the year with a $250,150 order from Indiana Bell. By January 1984, 60 units of Net/Alert had been shipped to a variety of clients, including Walt Disney World, the Library of Congress, Credit Suisse, El Paso Natural Gas, Florida Power & Light, and Public Service Electric & Gas Company. Avant-Garde's main rivals at the time comprised Tesdata Systems and Encom. Tesdata had been faltering financially while Encom's network management product was much smaller in scope than Net/Alert.

Avant-Garde employed 110 people in February 1984. Following a profitable third quarter of 1983 in which the company saw their sales double and revenues triple and received five new orders (including one from the IRSST, a government institution of Quebec), Avant-Garde moved their headquarters from Cherry Hill to a larger 36,000-square-foot building in Mount Laurel, New Jersey. The company also opened four regional offices across the nation: in Manhattan, Atlanta, Chicago, and San Francisco. In 1984, Inc. named Avant-Garde the 72nd fastest-growing corporation in the United States.

In May 1984, the company released Net/Guard, a network security hardware–software suite for mainframe computers. Features of Net/Guard include the creation of a log of all numbers who dialed into the mainframe, as well as the date, time, and length of those remote sessions; the ability to set a whitelist of phone numbers who can dial into the mainframe; the ability to limit what functions of the mainframe and what files in the mainframe's database may be accessed, on a per-user basis; and the ability to set security questions before the user is granted access the mainframe; among other features.

A month after it first shipped Net/Guard, Avant-Garde earned Bytex Corporation, a network switch manufacturer from Boston, as a client, and reported sales of $15.4 million and net income of $1.4 million in fiscal year 1984, a doubling of both figures from the previous year. Between May and July 1984, the company generated $5.7 million in sales, leading to $626,000 in profit, breaking previous records of profitability for the company. Employment in Avant-Garde reached 200 people total by the end of July. Avant-Garde closed 1984 (for the company, the second fiscal quarter of 1985) with a peak of $4.9 million in sales, leading to $396,000 in profit. This represented a slight diminishing of profits, as was predicted, due to a late delivery to a large client.

== Decline ==
Avant-Garde posted their first drop in earnings in March 1985 (during their third fiscal quarter of 1985). Although they had reached 52nd place in the Inc. 500 and gained even more clients as disparate as Target, Union Bank of Switzerland, Raytheon, MasterCard International, Ford, and Southern Company Services, the company realized fewer sales than in previous years, attributed to the gutting of Avant-Garde's senior sales staff. A lawsuit filed against Avant-Garde's European sales division in 1983 also penalized the company's earnings, through settlement costs and legal fees. In the final fiscal quarter of the year, the company reported "administrative confusion" and the inability to install customer's orders on-time, ultimately leading to a $392,000 loss by the end of the quarter—the company's first ever loss.

The company reached peak employment with 215 employees in August 1985; in the same month, the company posted their second consecutive quarterly loss. In an attempt at turning around the company's fortunes, Ahlstrom appointed Michael L. Sanyour, formerly the CEO and director of Subaru of America, as president and COO of Avant-Garde in October 1985. In January 1986, British Telecom signed an agreement with Avant-Garde to become the exclusive distributor of the company's products within the United Kingdom, The following month, Sperry Corporation won a non-exclusive distribution agreement to resell Avant-Garde's software in the United States. Avant-Garde extended their agreement with British Telecom in May. Avant-Garde had faith that these two alliances would increase direct sales of their products, although they admitted growth would be slow, their partnership with Sperry bearing no sales within the first two months. In February 1986, the company logged a $1.3 million loss for the last fiscal quarter of 1986. Meanwhile, Avant-Garde dropped to 81st place in the 1986 Inc. 500 list.

In late March 1986, the company introduced a pair of software packages for mainframes, Net/Command and Net/Adviser. Net/Command was a network monitoring package that could run on a single networked workstation and provided control tools and diagnostics to system operators. Net/Adviser meanwhile was an add-on for Net/Command that used artificial intelligence to recommend solutions for the problems that Net/Command identified. Both products directly competed with IBM's NetView, with Network World calling Avant-Garde the "company most aggressively pursuing the same niche as IBM", and Net/Command being "the only true competitor to NetView".

Despite Avant-Garde trimming executive salaries by 20 percent and staff down to 160 by July 1986, the company reported losses of $2.3 million during the final fiscal quarter of 1986, contributing to an annual loss of $5.2 million. Sanyour resigned as president of Avant-Garde in August 1986, citing a loss of interest in the company. Ahlstrom reassumed his position. The string of quarterly losses continued unabated in fiscal year 1987: the first quarter with $774,000, the second with $895,000. the third with $541,000; and another loss in fourth quarter (reportedly far less than the third). The company broke its two-year losing streak in the next two quarters, with net profits of $87,000 and $247,000, owing to a newly imposed cost-cutting regime within the company and a reduction in staff to 150. The victory was short-lived however, as the company reported a $408,000 loss the quarter after. At the end of the fiscal year, the company reported another annual loss, of $2.3 million.

In May 1988, executives tasked Weeden Capital Management, the company's market maker, on possible transactions that could be taken to save the company, including partial or total sale of Avant-Garde's assets. Concurrent Computer Corporation later agreed to distribute Avant-Garde's products to the American federal government, as well as in Canada, Australia, New Zealand, and Japan and other countries in Southeast Asia, in August 1988.

Following a $1.6 million loss in the first quarter of the following fiscal year, Ahlstrom resigned from Avant-Garde, citing health reasons. Richard Abraham, boardroom director since 1987, was named the new president and CEO. The company reported a $562,000 loss in the second fiscal quarter; a much larger loss of $2 million followed in the next quarter, prompting bankruptcy negotiations within the company. After six months of deliberation, Boole & Babbage, a software company in San Jose, agreed to purchase Avant-Garde and assume certain liabilities for $4 million in cash. As part of the agreement, Avant-Garde filed for Chapter 11 bankruptcy in July 1989. The company lost $4.5 million between April and July 1989, nearly double that of their losses for the entire prior fiscal year. In September 1989, Avant-Garde agreed to pay $1.05 million divided among shareholders who filed a class-action lawsuit against the company in 1985, charging that the company had misled underwriters during its IPO. This settlement contributed to the company posting its final loss of $2.9 million at the end of the second quarter of its final fiscal year.

The bankruptcy court of Trenton, New Jersey, approved Boole & Babbage's acquisition of Avant-Garde in January 1990. The takeover completed in February 1990. Avant-Garde remained a subsidiary of Boole & Babbage for some time after the purchase, later being renamed to Boole & Babbage Network Systems (not to be confused with Network Systems Corporation).
