= MainView =

- Industry: office automation software
- Founded: 1990
- Founder: Boole & Babbage

MainView, currently advertised as BMC MainView, is a systems management software produced by BMC Software. It was created in 1990 by Boole & Babbage and became part of BMC Software's services after they bought out Boole & Babbage in a stock swap.

== History ==
MainView was created in 1990 by Boole & Babbage as office automation software, designed specifically to work on IBM hardware. The product was designed so that companies would be able to automate their data management systems as well as being able to control what is automated within each enterprise. In 1993, it was updated to include support for parallel processors.

The system gained popularity with users being pleased with its real-time data however expressed dissatisfaction with its usage of counterfactual history to make decisions. In 1998, following BMC Software's purchase of Boole & Babbage, they announced that they would continue to operate MainView by directly integrating it with their IBM hardware products rather than continuing to sell it as specifically as a separate software product. BMC Software continued to upgrade MainView to be compatible with new technologies. In 2016, MainView was upgraded to be compatible with Java Environments.

== Advertising ==
In 1993, Boole & Babbage signed a deal with Paramount Pictures to license Star Trek for use in their advertising. The first way they used it was to advertise MainView. They produced a short advertising film titled "The Vision", which included Star Trek: The Next Generation's Commander William Riker (played by Jonathan Frakes, with whom B&B also signed a spokesman's deal) using MainView on the bridge of the USS Enterprise to promote MainView. Boole & Babbage also used Frakes to promote MainView in person at the Computer Measurement Group conference as well as to announce that MainView would become available for singular desktop computers later in that year.

== See also ==
- OS/2
