= Avant-garde (disambiguation) =

Avant-garde refers to a style in experimental work in art, music, culture, or politics.

Avant-garde may also refer to:

- Avant-Garde (magazine), a graphic design magazine
- ITC Avant Garde, a typeface
- Avant-Garde Computing, a defunct networking software company
- Avant-Garde, youth section of the French Milice paramilitary organization
- Zaila Avant-garde, winner of 2021 93rd Scripps National Spelling Bee

== Music ==
- Avant-garde music
- Avant-garde jazz
- The Avant-Garde (album), an album by John Coltrane and Don Cherry
- The Avant-Garde (duo), a 1960s American pop group
- Avant Garde (band), a 1980s American progressive metal band
- Avantgarde (band), a 2000s Spanish indie rock band
- Avant-garde metal, a subgenre of heavy metal music
- Avantgarde Music, an Italian record label

== See also ==
- Avant-pop
- Lists of avant-garde films
- Advance guard (Avant-garde)
- Vanguard
