= Boole & Babbage =

Boole & Babbage Incorporated
- Formerly: K & K Associates
- Type: Public
- Industry: Software
- Founded: 1967; 59 years ago
- Founders: Ken Kolence; David Kaitch
- Defunct: March 1999; 27 years ago
- Fate: Acquired by BMC Software
- Headquarters: San Jose, California, US

Boole & Babbage Incorporated, founded as K & K Associates, was an American automation computer software company based in San Jose, California. It was the oldest systems management company in the world before being bought out in a stock swap by BMC Software, announced in late 1998 and completed in early 1999.

== History ==
Boole & Babbage (a reference to 19th century English mathematicians George Boole and Charles Babbage, early theorists of what would eventually become the Information Age) was founded with three employees in Palo Alto, California, in 1967 as K & K Associates by Ken Kolence and David Kaitch. The company, later headquartered in San Jose, California, changed its name to Boole & Babbage after an investment from Franklin "Pitch" Johnson, becoming the first software company in Silicon Valley to receive venture capital funding. Its main product was a computer mainframe monitoring package which was the first software that allowed the tracking of hours. The company had a million dollars in sales in its first year.

By 1972, the company's large expenses outstripped its profits, so Bruce Coleman was appointed as president to lower expenses; this was accomplished by 1978, after which Coleman left the company. Boole & Babbage almost went bankrupt when their products became obsolete due to upgrades in IBM hardware. In the 1980s, the company developed new software and went public. In 1984 IBM changed its operating systems, rendering a number of Boole & Babbage's products obsolete. In response, Coleman returned as president. The company created COMMAND/Post for client/server systems in 1990, and it soon became their main product.

In 1990, Boole & Babbage acquired Avant-Garde Computing, a maker of network management, monitoring, and security software and hardware.

== Advertising ==
In 1993, Boole & Babbage announced at the Computer Measurement Group annual conference that they would pay Paramount Pictures $75,000 a year for a two-year licence to use Star Trek imagery in their advertising for COMMAND/Post and MainView. They used actor Jonathan Frakes, playing his character Commander William Riker from Star Trek: The Next Generation, in their Star Trek advertisements. One of the early advertisements, titled "The Vision", featured Frakes as Commander Riker on the USS Enterprise bridge set.

== Decline and sale ==
In the late 1990s, the computer industry started to become dominated by larger companies and Boole & Babbage were having trouble competing. In October 1998, the board of Boole & Babbage agreed to be acquired in whole by BMC Software, through a stock swap valued at US$1 billion (equivalent to $2 billion in 2025). The swap was completed in March 1999.
