= Art pop (disambiguation) =

Art pop is a loosely defined style of pop music that draws on art theories and ideas from other forms of art.

The term may also refer to:

- Art Pop (album), a 2007 album by British rock band Githead
- Artpop, a 2013 album by American singer Lady Gaga
  - "Artpop" (song), the album's title track

== See also ==
- Art into Pop
- Art Pope
- Avant-pop (disambiguation)
- Pop art (disambiguation)
