= Avante =

Avante (Portuguese: "forward") can refer to:

- Avante!, Portuguese Communist newspaper
- Avante (political party), a political party in Brazil
- Avante (album), Portuguese-language album by Joelma, 2016
- Avante Dickerson (born 2003), American football player
- Hyundai Avante, also known as the Hyundai Elantra
- Tamiya Avante, a 1/10-scale radio-controlled buggy introduced by MRC-Tamiya in 1988
- Avante, Portuguese-language album by Siba, 2012
- Avante International, a manufacturer of optical scan voting systems
- Avante, a defunct Polish television channel offered by Wizja TV
