= Pop Hart =

American artist

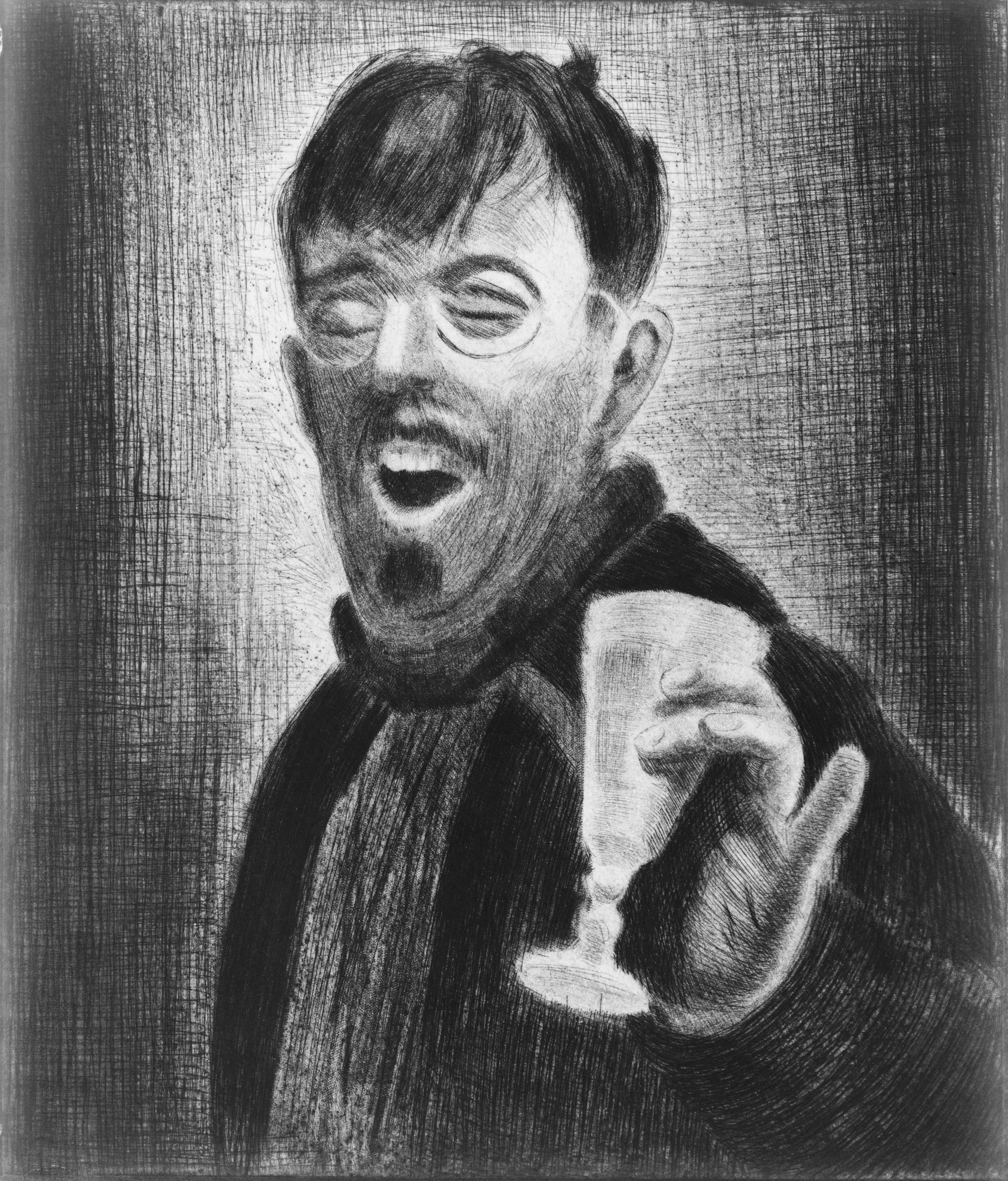
- 1925 self-portrait
- Born: George Overbury Hart; May 10, 1868; Cairo, Illinois
- Died: September 9, 1933 (aged 65); New York City
- Known for: Painting

George Overbury "Pop" Hart (May 10, 1868 – September 9, 1933) was an early 20th century American painter and watercolorist.

== Early life and education ==
Hart was born in Cairo, Illinois, the eldest of four children, and raised in Rochester, New York. His father managed a printing roller factory, and Hart worked there for a time in his teens but lost the job due to an explosion that took place when he was off sketching instead of watching the glue vats. Around the age of 18, he went to London on a cattle boat and while in England became an itinerant sign painter to support himself. Eventually he landed in Chicago, where he worked for a while as an illustrator for a newspaper and also as a sign painter for the Chicago World's Fair of 1893 and other clients. Although Hart was initially self-taught, in the 1890s he attended the Chicago Art Institute on and off for several years, and in 1907 he spent a year at the Académie Julien in Paris.

For the first few years of the 20th century, Hart traveled all over the world: to Mexico, Central America, North Africa, the Caribbean, and the South Pacific, where he visited Tahiti in 1903, shortly after the death of Gauguin. Following his 1907 studies in Paris, he supported himself for about five years by working as a sign painter around New York City, and then he worked for most of a decade painting sets for the nascent film industry in New Jersey. He set up a studio in Coytesville, a neighborhood in Fort Lee, New Jersey, but he spent much of the 1920s traveling again.

Hart is said to have acquired his nickname of "Pop" after growing a beard during one of his many trips, and thereafter many of his works appear with the signature "Pop Hart". He died in 1933 in Coytesville, where he had lived in poor health during his last years.

== Career ==
From his early travels onward, Hart worked often in the highly portable medium of watercolor, and he developed a loose, vigorous style that eventually attracted the attention of Knoedler Gallery in New York, which gave him his first show. Critics have singled out his eye for detail, his technical accomplishment, and his roguish humor for praise.

After moving to the New York City area, Hart became part of an artist colony in Fort Lee, New Jersey, that included such champions of avant-garde art as Walt Kuhn, Arthur B. Davies, and Edward Hopper. Among his close friends in New York art circles were members of the Ashcan School of social realism, especially Robert Henri and John Sloan. Hart painted seaside and marine subjects near his studio in Coytesville, New Jersey, as well as a wide range of other subjects including animals, botanical studies, nudes, and landscapes. On his travels, he focused on people's daily activities and street scenes, giving those works a markedly dynamic quality that meshes well with his spontaneous, fluid brushwork. His style varies: some works show affinity with the delicate expressiveness of John Marin and Cézanne, while others lean towards the brusquer social realism of Diego Rivera or Robert Henri.

By 1921 he had taken up printmaking, working in drypoint, etching, and lithography from sketches made during his trips. During this time he became a member, and then President of the Society of American Graphic Artists. Hart also continued to work in watercolor as well as gouache and was considered one of the leading watercolor artists of his day. He was awarded a bronze metal at the Sesquicentennial Exposition in Philadelphia, Pennsylvania, in 1926, and in 1935 the Newark Museum mounted a memorial retrospective exhibition of his work.

An indication of his popularity during his lifetime is the fact that in December, 1929 some of Hart's paintings were included in a New York exhibition of nineteen living American painters held by the Museum of Modern Art - the second exhibition held by the museum. His work was also part of the painting event in the art competition at the 1932 Summer Olympics.

Hart's work is in the collections of the Museum of Modern Art, New York; the Brooklyn Museum; the San Francisco Museum of Modern Art; the Smithsonian Institution; the Los Angeles County Museum of Art; the British Museum, and other institutions in the United States and Europe. However, the largest single collection of his work is held by the Zimmerli Art Museum at Rutgers University, which received some 5000 items as a gift from Hart's niece, Jeane Overbury Hart, in the early 1980s. The Zimmerli Museum mounted a survey show of Hart's work in 1986 to coincide with the publication of a book on Hart's life and work by Gregory Gilbert, then a research fellow in Rutgers's Department of Art History.

== Selected works ==
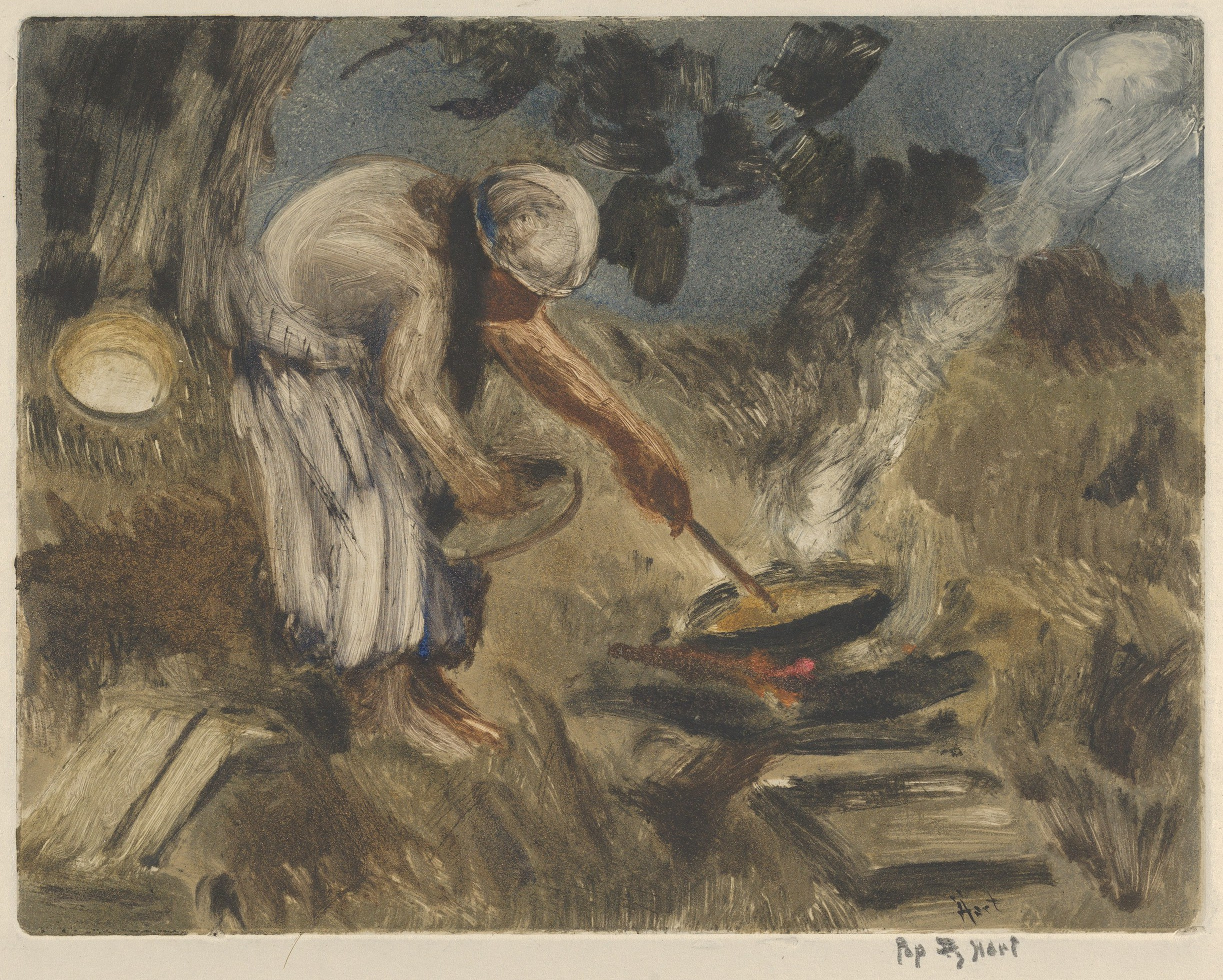
The Hostess

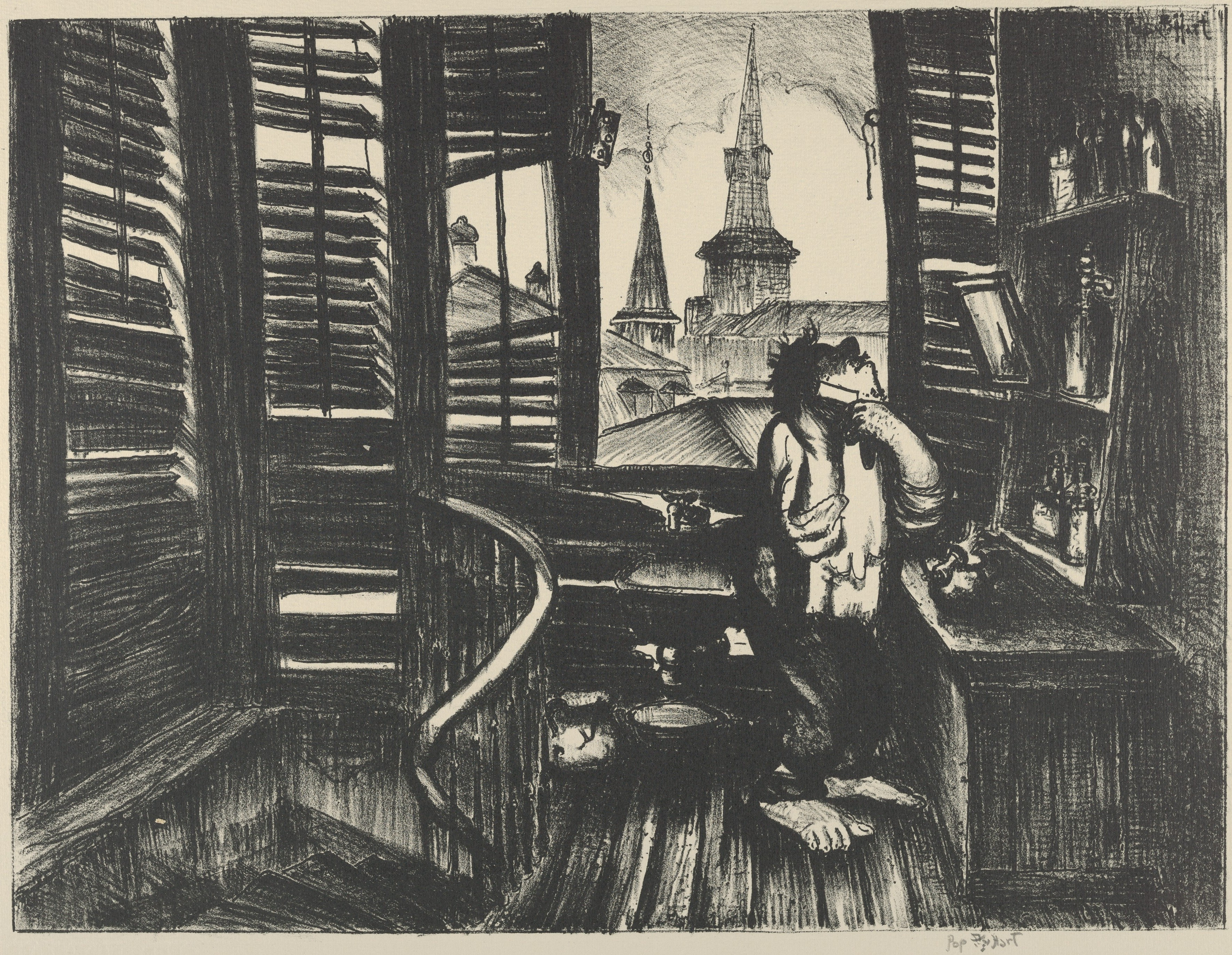
Springtime, New Orleans

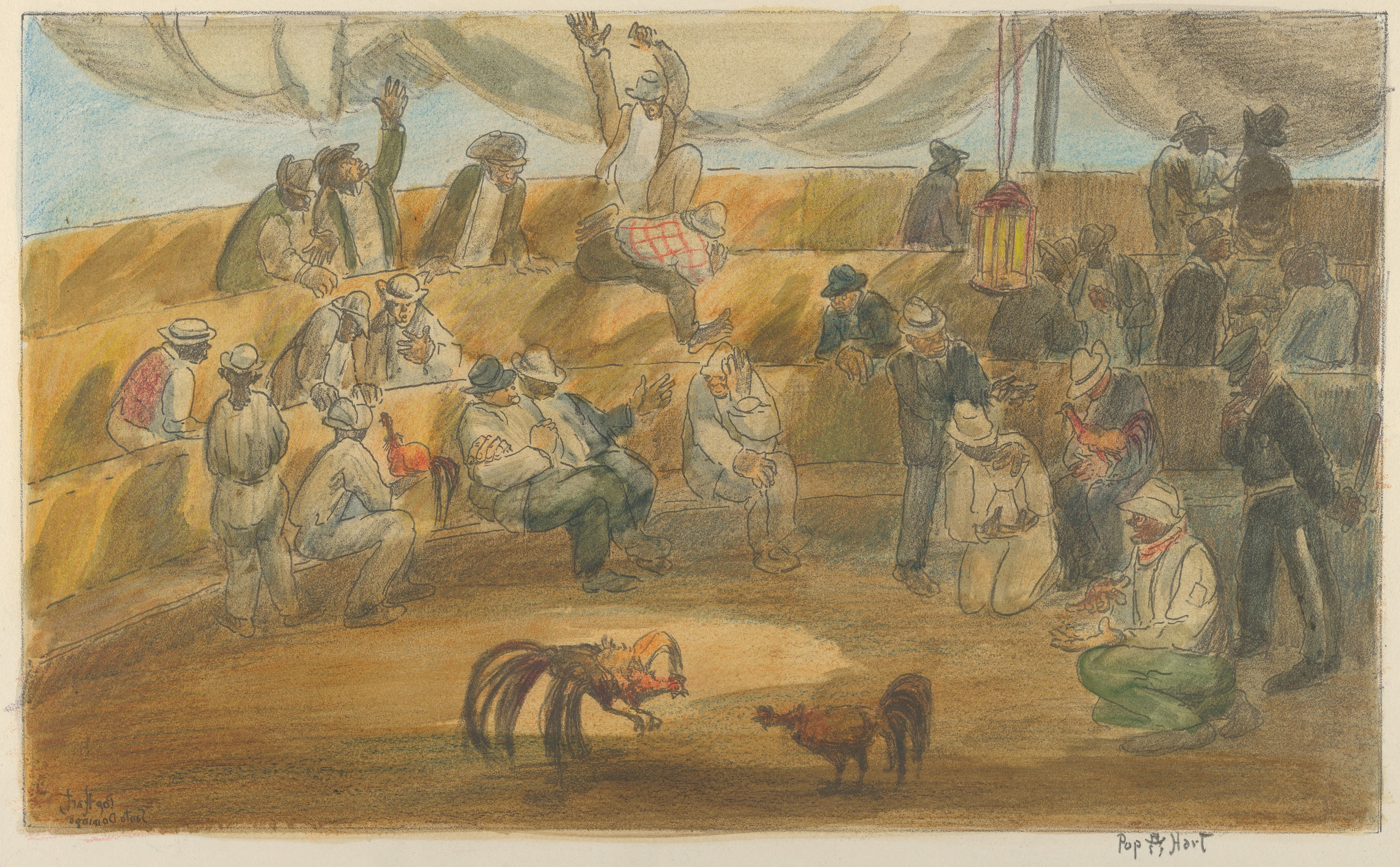
Cockfight, Santo Domingo

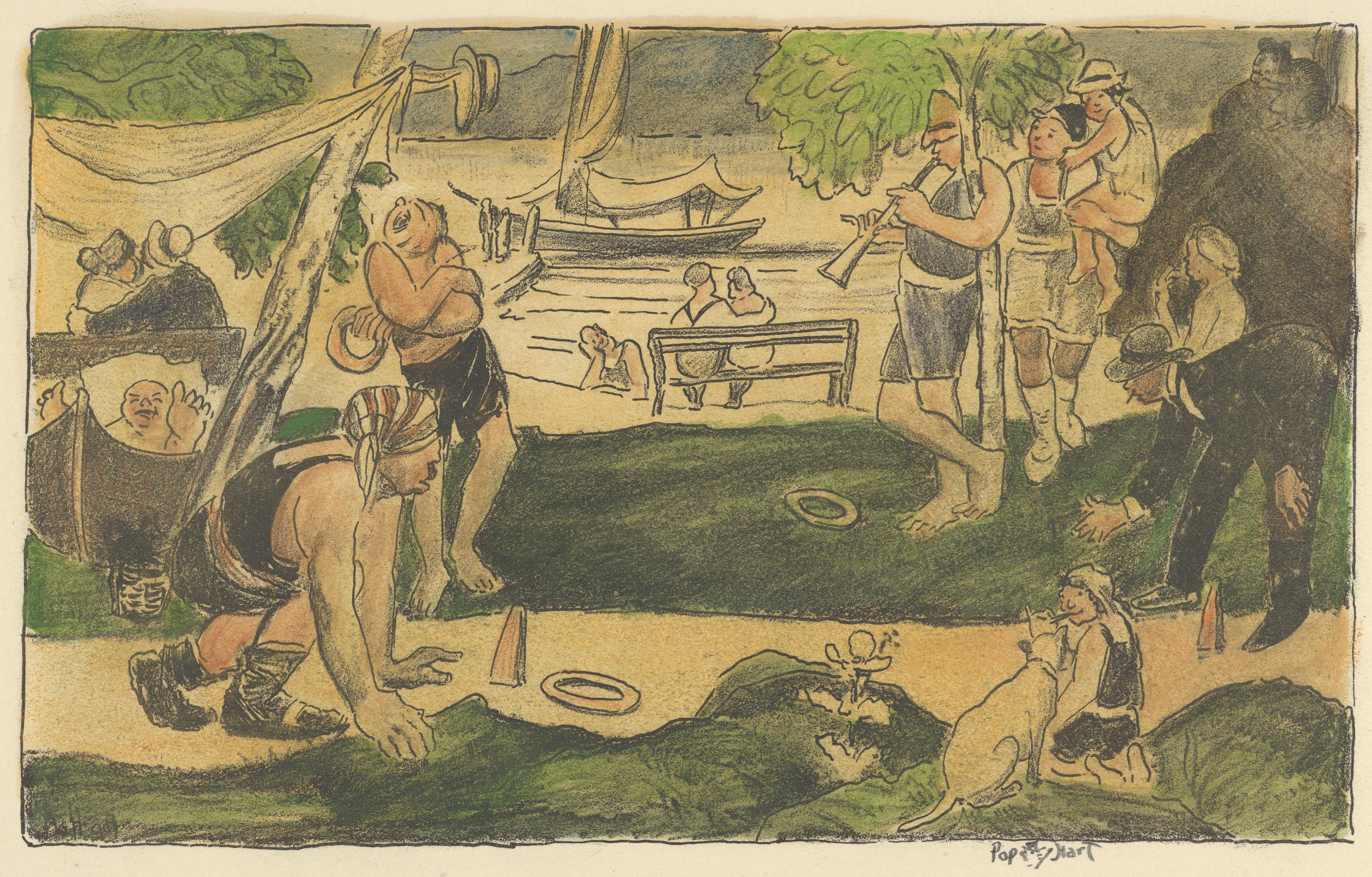
Sunday Picnic Along the Hudson

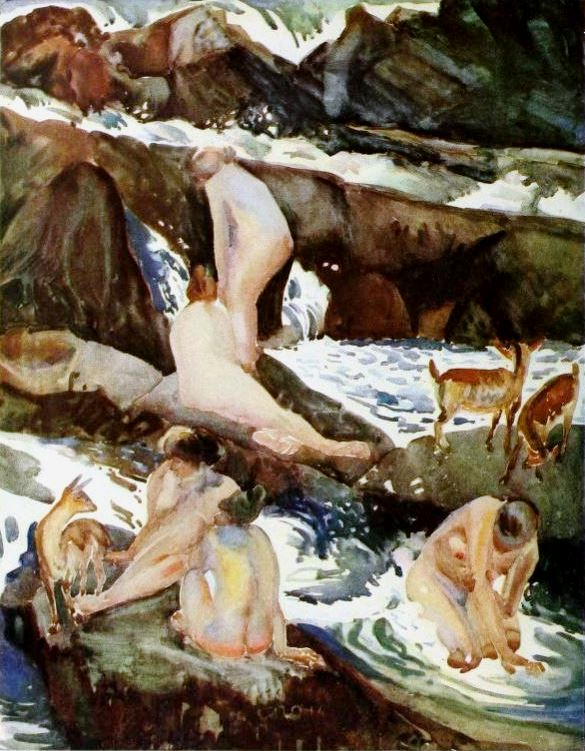
The Bathers

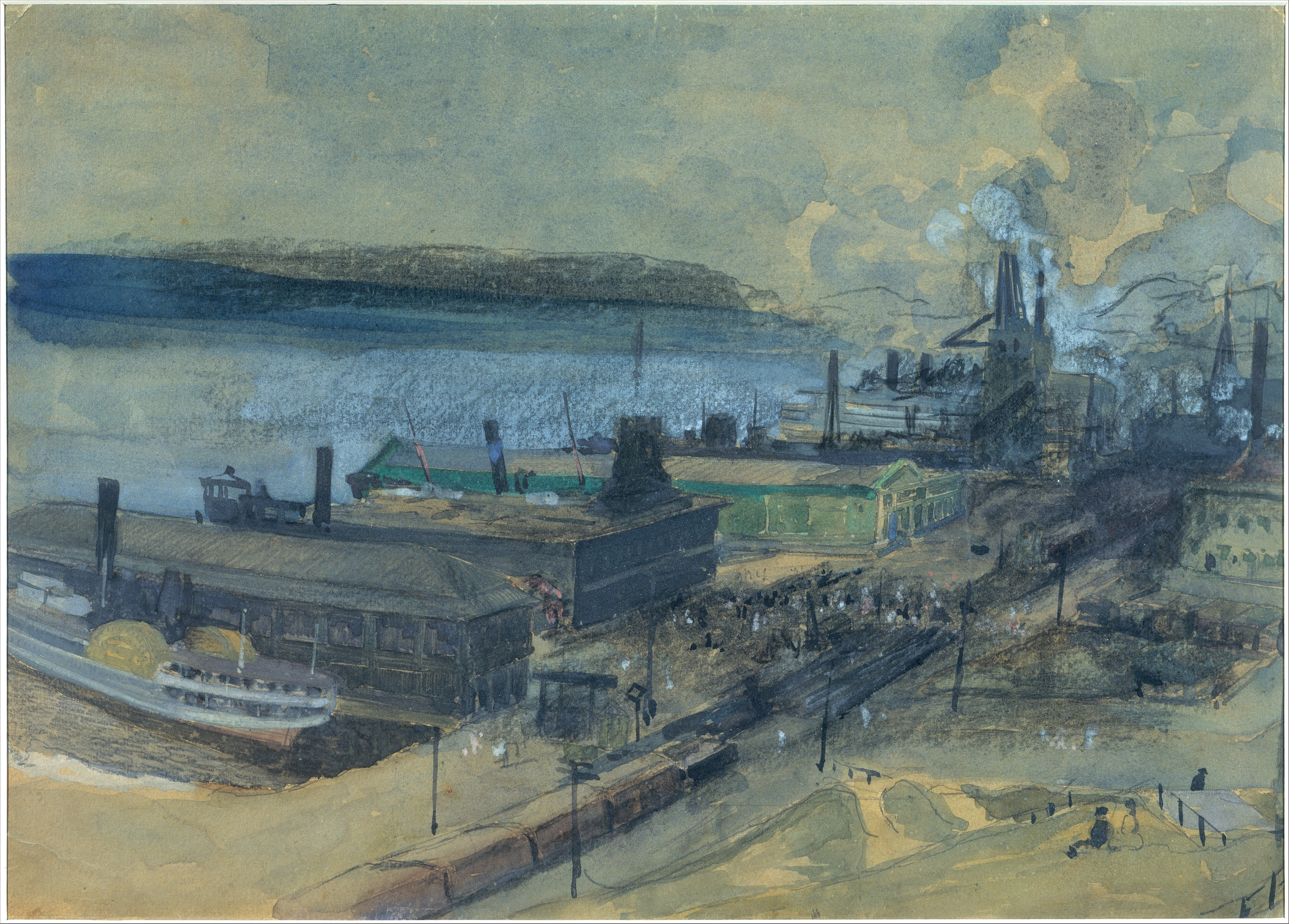
The 125th Street Ferry
