= Institut de recherche Robert-Sauvé en santé et en sécurité du travail =

Research institute and academic publisher

The Institut de recherche Robert-Sauvé en santé et en sécurité du travail (IRSST) (Occupational Health and Safety Research Institute) is a private, non-profit organization known for its scientific research on the prevention of industrial accidents and occupational diseases and the rehabilitation of affected workers. It was established in Quebec in 1980.

Its board of directors is composed of an equal number of trade union and employers' representatives. The Commission des normes, de l'équité, de la santé et de la sécurité du travail (CNESST) provides most of the Institute's funding from the contributions it collects from employers.

IRSST's mission is to contribute to workers' health and safety through research, its laboratories' expertise, and knowledge dissemination and transfer, with a view to promoting prevention and sustainable return to work.

== Reference framework ==
As both a research center and a funding organization, the expertise of the Institut Institut is divided into 3 research orientations and 6 themes:

=== Orientations ===
- Prevention of physical and mental impairments
- Rehabilitation and sustainable return to work
- OHS data surveillance and data mining

=== Themes ===
- Identification of hazards, estimation and assessment of risks
- Elimination of hazards and control of risks
- Metrology applied to OHS
- Organization of work
- Mental and psychological health
- Population, society and OHS

== See also ==
- Official website
