= Avantgarde (band) =

Spanish band

- Origin: Spain
- Genres: Indie rock, indie pop
- Years active: 2003–2006
- Labels: V2 Music
- Members: Victor Cobos; Miguel Goni; Phillippe D´huart; Carlos Piris

Avantgarde was an indie rock band from Madrid, Spain.

They scored two albums and toured across Spain and Portugal with the Spanish musician Deluxe.

== Discography ==
=== Albums ===
- Super L (April 2004)
- Read Between the Lines (April 2005)

=== Singles ===
- "Awake" (March 2004)
- "Dostoievski" (July 2004)
- "Are you playing a game?" (March 2005)
- "Ink" (March 2006)
