= Calf Island (Connecticut) =

Island in Connecticut, United States

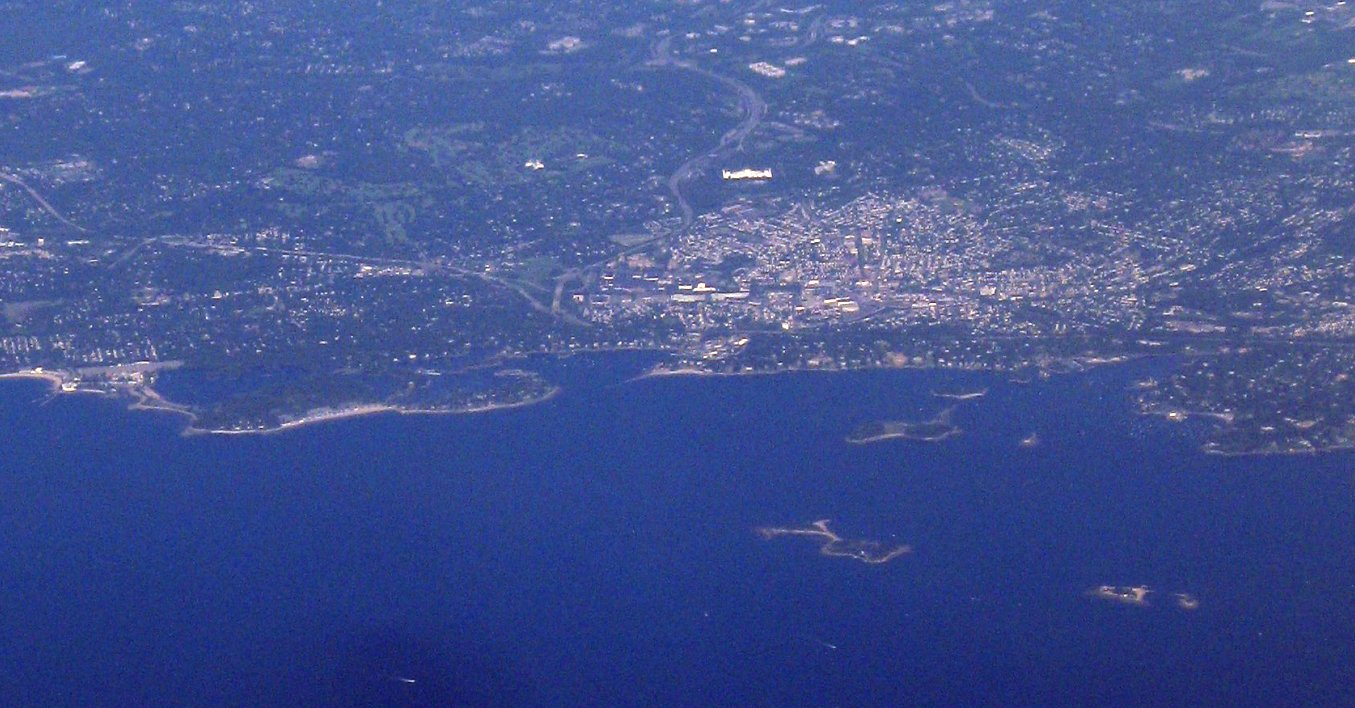
- Calf Island (highest of the three large islands in bottom right) as seen facing Port Chester, New York

- Location within Connecticut

Geography
- Location: Long Island Sound
- Coordinates: 40.993°N 73.6395°W
- Area: 27.5 acres (11.1 ha)

Administration
- USA
- State: Connecticut
- City: Greenwich

Calf Island, between 27.5-acre (111,000 m^{2}) and 31.5-acre (127,000 m^{2}) island about 3,000 feet (910 m) from the Byram shore of Greenwich, Connecticut, in Long Island Sound. It is connected at low tide to the Greenwich Land Trust's Shell Island. The size of the island is a best estimate as different sources cite different sizes for the island; while the oldest estimates put it at around 20-acre (81,000 m^{2}) the GIS system puts it at 31.5-acre (127,000 m^{2}) The island is open for visitors; although, as of the summer of 2006, it was getting relatively few of them.

The island is the largest one in Greenwich waters. More than half of the island (on the west side) is a bird sanctuary off-limits to members of the public without permission to visit. The island is available for overnight stays for those with permits, otherwise the east side is open from dawn till dusk.

The island is home to cowbirds, yellow warblers, starlings, catbirds, diamondback terrapins, ospreys, great blue herons and canada geese. great and snowy egrets can also be seen there. sassafras, hickory, maple and beech trees, along with oriental bittersweet and multiflora roses, grow there.

== Use ==
The Boys and Girls Club of Greenwich, Audubon Greenwich, SoundWaters, church groups and high school athletic teams all have regularly scheduled trips to the island. In 2006, the Greenwich parks department scheduled four of its "Cruise to Nowhere" trips to the island.

== Administration ==
When the federal government bought the island in 2003, it joined the Stewart B. McKinney National Wildlife Refuge, a collection of federally owned islands along 70 miles (110 km) of Connecticut coastline from Greenwich to Westbrook.

The Calf Island Community Trust, Inc., opposed the transfer of the island from the Greenwich Family YMCA to the federal government, in part because a permit would be required for some activities on the island; nevertheless, the purchase was made.

Calf Island Conservation, Inc., a volunteer group, helps maintain and improve the island. The group spent $65,000 on the island in 2005 and 2006. Upgrades of bathrooms, buildings, trails and docking facilities are planned.

The president of the board of directors in 2018 was Paul Barbian.
