= Silas Edward Mead House =

Historic house in Connecticut, U.S.

Coordinates: 41°05′47″N 73°42′09″W

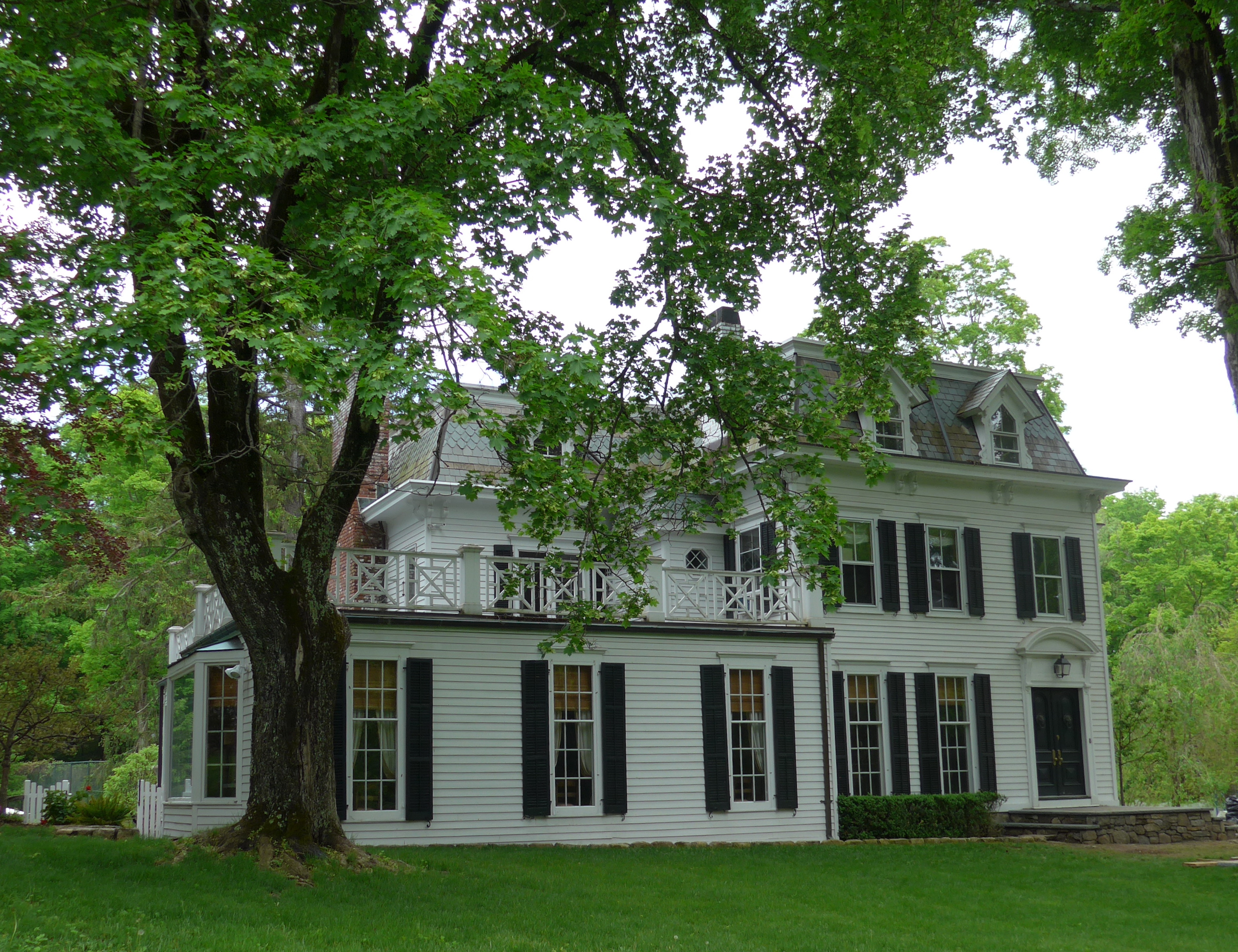
The Silas Edward Mead House

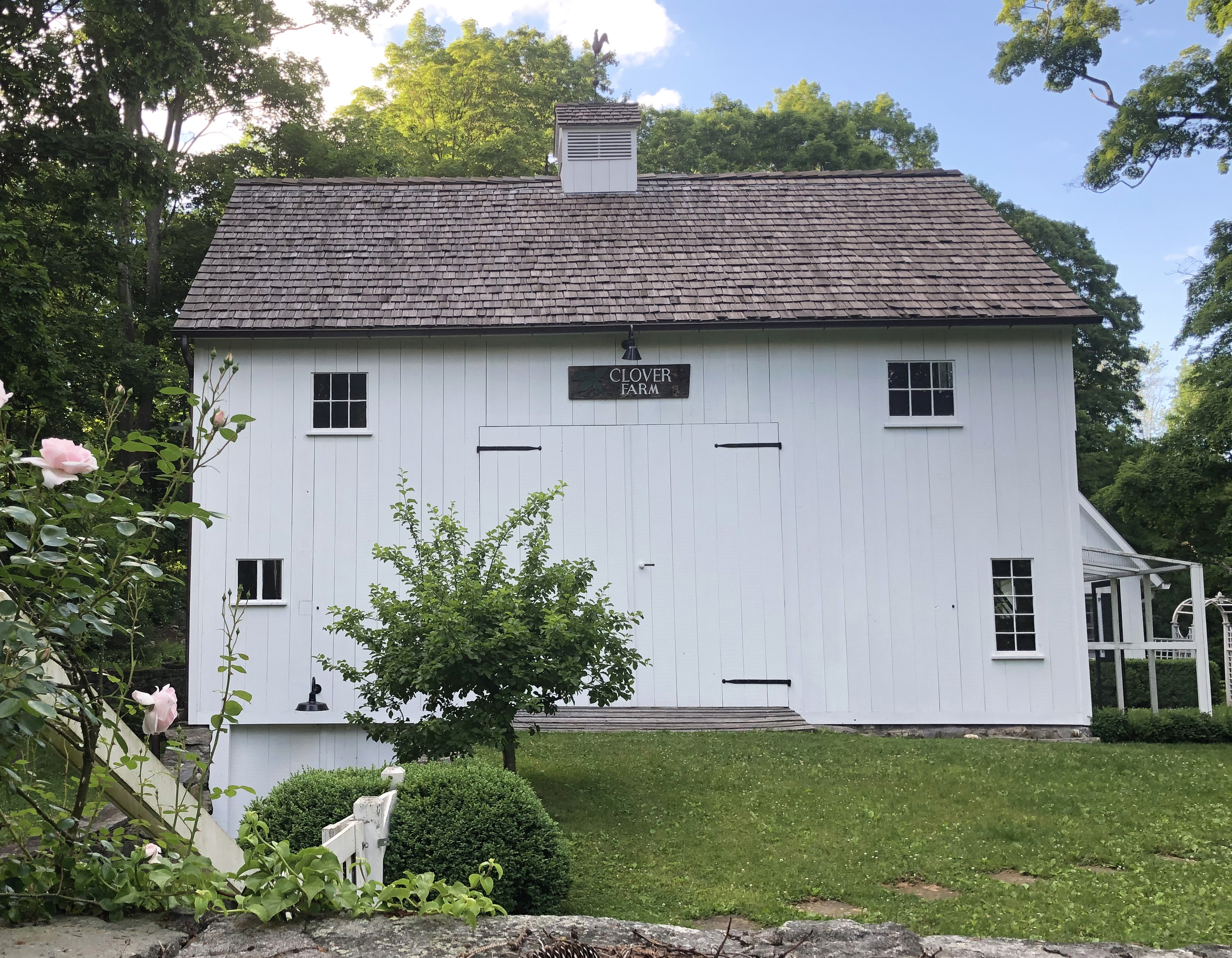
The barn

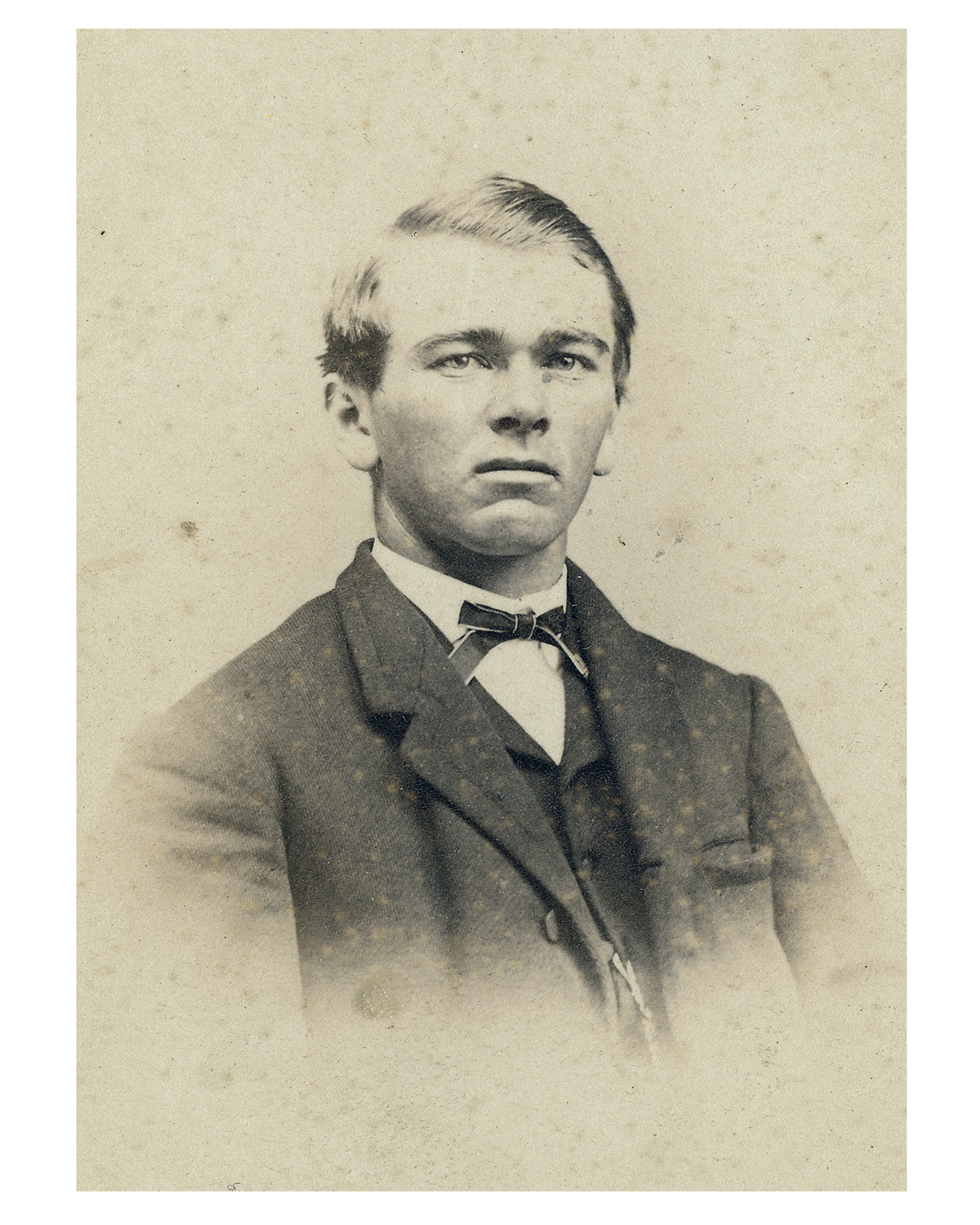
Silas Edward Mead

The Silas Edward Mead House is a historic house at 215 John Street in Greenwich, Connecticut, United States. The house was built just after the Civil War (circa 1868) by Silas Edward Mead in the Second Empire architectural style.

== Description ==
The Silas Edward Mead House, also known informally as Clover Farm, stands on five acres on the corner of John Street and Bedford Road in the Backcountry section of Greenwich, Connecticut. The house is sheathed in clapboard siding with a slate shingle mansard roof. The main façade faces Bedford Road to the west. The main entry includes a pair of doors on the south corner of the west side of the house. An arched pediment tops the door and the entryway is reached by a stone porch and steps. To the north of the door are two large six-over-nine double-hung windows with shutters. Above are three two-over-two double-hung windows with shutters. Two gable-roofed dormers are above the eave, which has decorative brackets. Extensive additions have been added to the house.

The house shares its property with a historically significant barn (circa 1750) featured in Preservation Connecticut's Historic Barns of Connecticut survey, and listed on the State Register of Historic Places.

== History ==
Silas Edward Mead is a descendant of John Mead, one of the 27 original landowners who bought Greenwich from the Indians in 1640. The Meads were prolific home builders; in 1833, there were 97 Mead dwellings on the Greenwich assessor's list.

Silas Edward Mead is also known for correspondence with his sister (Tillie) during the Civil War. Their 218 letters, housed at the Greenwich Historical Society, provide us with a vivid account of both a soldiers life, and civilian life in Greenwich during the war.
