= Blue Harbour =

Blue Harbour or Harbor may refer to:

- Blue Harbour (clothing), an M&S clothing brand
- Blue Harbour Group, an American investment company
- Blue Harbor Resort, resort in Wisconsin, United States
- Blue Harbour, a house on Noel Coward's Firefly Estate in Jamaica
