= Pemberwick, Connecticut =

Census-designated place in Connecticut, United States

- Census-designated place
- Location in Fairfield County and the state of Connecticut
- Coordinates: 41°01′32″N 73°39′39″W
- Country: United States
- State: Connecticut
- County: Fairfield
- City: Greenwich

Area
  - Total: 0.693 sq mi (1.79 km^{2})
  - Land: 0.679 sq mi (1.76 km^{2})
  - Water: 0.014 sq mi (0.036 km^{2})

Population (2020)
  - Total: 3,899
  - Density: 5,740/sq mi (2,220/km^{2})
- Time zone: UTC−5:00 (Eastern)
  - Summer (DST): UTC−4:00 (Eastern)
- Area code: 203
- FIPS code: 09-59210
- GNIS feature ID: 2631572

Pemberwick is a neighborhood/section and census-designated place in Greenwich in Fairfield County, Connecticut, United States. As of the 2020 census, Pemberwick had a population of 3,899.

== Geography ==
The town of Greenwich is one political and taxing body, but consists of several distinct sections or neighborhoods, such as Banksville, Byram, Cos Cob, Glenville, Mianus, Old Greenwich, Riverside and Greenwich (sometimes referred to as central, or downtown, Greenwich). Of these neighborhoods, three (Cos Cob, Old Greenwich, and Riverside) have separate postal names and ZIP Codes. The Pemberwick neighborhood is on the west side of Greenwich, bordered to the north by Glenville, to the east by central Greenwich, to the south by Byram, and to the west by Port Chester, New York. U.S. Route 1 (West Putnam Avenue) forms the southern edge of Pemberwick. The Byram River flows from north to south through the community.

According to the United States Census Bureau, Pemberwick has a total area of 0.693 square miles (1.79 km^{2}), of which 0.679 square miles (1.76 km^{2}) is land and 0.014 square miles (0.036 km^{2}), or 2.02%, is water.

== Demographics ==
=== 2020 census ===
As of the 2020 census, Pemberwick had a population of 3,899. The median age was 43.2 years. 20.9% of residents were under the age of 18 and 17.8% of residents were 65 years of age or older. For every 100 females there were 87.7 males, and for every 100 females age 18 and over there were 83.3 males age 18 and over.

100.0% of residents lived in urban areas, while 0.0% lived in rural areas.

There were 1,576 households in Pemberwick, of which 33.3% had children under the age of 18 living in them. Of all households, 50.6% were married-couple households, 15.6% were households with a male householder and no spouse or partner present, and 29.6% were households with a female householder and no spouse or partner present. About 28.6% of all households were made up of individuals and 14.3% had someone living alone who was 65 years of age or older.

There were 1,675 housing units, of which 5.9% were vacant. The homeowner vacancy rate was 1.8% and the rental vacancy rate was 4.6%.

Racial composition as of the 2020 census
Race	Number	Percent
White	2,857	73.3%
Black or African American	64	1.6%
American Indian and Alaska Native	9	0.2%
Asian	268	6.9%
Native Hawaiian and Other Pacific Islander	2	0.1%
Some other race	324	8.3%
Two or more races	375	9.6%
Hispanic or Latino (of any race)	609	15.6%

== Education ==
As with other parts of the Town of Greenwich, Pemberwick is in the Greenwich Public Schools school district. The district's comprehensive high school is Greenwich High School.
