= Rock Ridge, Connecticut =

Census-designated place in Connecticut, United States

- Census-designated place
- Location within Connecticut Location within the United States
- Coordinates: 41°2′9″N 73°38′52″W
- Country: United States
- State: Connecticut
- County: Fairfield
- Town: Greenwich

Area
  - Total: 0.91 sq mi (2.36 km^{2})
  - Land: 0.91 sq mi (2.36 km^{2})
  - Water: 0 sq mi (0.0 km^{2})
- Elevation: 130 ft (40 m)
- Time zone: UTC-5 (Eastern (EST))
  - Summer (DST): UTC-4 (EDT)
- ZIP Code: 06831 (Greenwich)
- Area codes: 203/475
- FIPS code: 09-65160
- GNIS feature ID: 2805962

Rock Ridge is a census-designated place (CDP) in the town of Greenwich, Connecticut, United States. It is in the western part of the town, just 1 mile (2 km) east of the New York state border. As of the 2020 census, Rock Ridge had a population of 658. Rock Ridge was first listed as a CDP prior to the 2020 census.

== Education ==
As with other parts of the Town of Greenwich, Rock Ridge is in the Greenwich Public Schools school district. The district's comprehensive high school is Greenwich High School.
