= Greenwich Land Trust =

American nonprofit organization

- Formation: September 9, 1976; 49 years ago
- Founder: Paul van der Stricht
- Type: Nonprofit organization
- Headquarters: 376 Round Hill Road; Greenwich, Connecticut, U.S. 06831
- President: Jacqueline C. Keeshan
- Vice President: S. Wear Culvahouse, MD
- Vice President: Urling Searle
- Staff: 5+ FTEs
- Website: gltrust.org

Greenwich Land Trust (officially The Greenwich Land Trust, Inc.) is an independent nonprofit organization based in Greenwich, Connecticut with the focus on open space conservation. Established in 1976 by Paul van der Stricht the organization currently manages 869+ acres of protected open space.

Most recently, GLT in a joint-venture with the Town of Greenwich, acquired more than 70 acres of open space from the Aquarion Water Company in September 2020. In December 2021 they acquired 8 more acres from the company for permanent preservation.

== History ==
On September 9, 1976, GLT is established as an independent nonprofit organization, separate from the existing Greenwich Audubon Society by Paul van der Stricht. At the beginning there were approximately 20 landowners with 100 acres of preservation land. Over the years many notable donations were made and the trusts land under management grew to over 869 acres (2023).

In 2012, Louise Mueller, donated her 4-acre parcel at 376 Round Hill Road to the GLT, with several historic buildings such as a main farmhouse, three barns, a stone potting shed and the remains of a greenhouse. Once part of one of Greenwichs great estates named The Orchard it currently houses the administrative headquarters of GLT and serves as hub for education and conservation work. It is currently known as Louise Mueller Preserve.
