= Greenwich Y.M.C.A. =

- Greenwich YMCA
- U.S. National Register of Historic Places
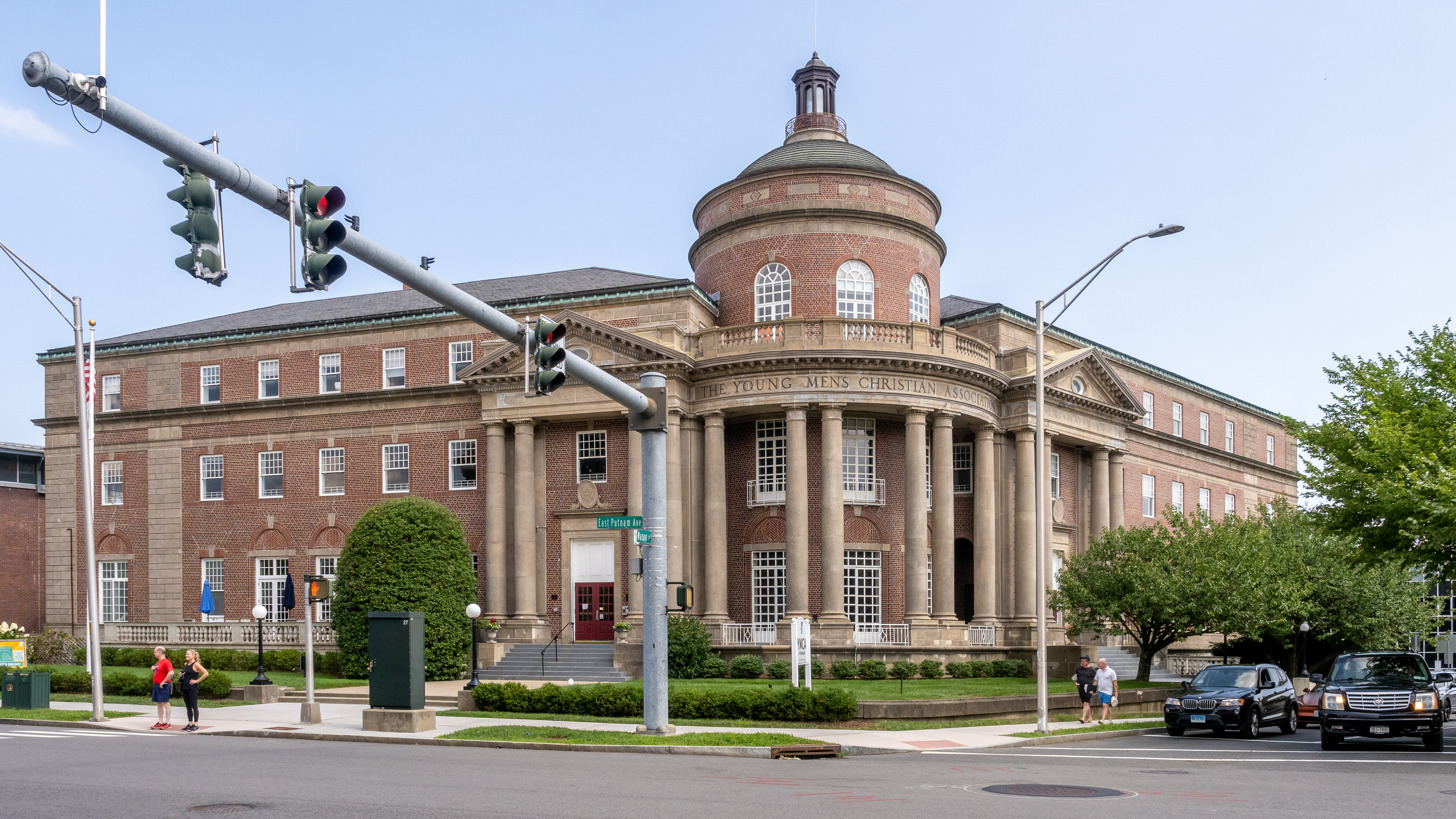

- Location within Connecticut Location within the United States
- Location: 50 East Putnam Avenue, Greenwich, Connecticut
- Coordinates: 41°1′55″N 73°37′32″W
- Area: less than one acre
- Built: 1916
- Architect: Emory, M.L.; Emory, H.G.
- Architectural style: Colonial Revival, Georgian Revival
- Website: http://www.greenwichymca.org/
- NRHP reference No.: 83004541
- Added to NRHP: November 7, 1996

Greenwich YMCA is a historic building at 50 East Putnam Avenue in Greenwich, Connecticut. Built in 1916 as a gift from Mrs. Nathaniel Witherill, it is a distinctive example of Colonial Revival / Georgian Revival style with Beaux Arts flourishes. The building was listed on the U.S. National Register of Historic Places in 1996.

== Description and history ==
Greenwich YMCA is located at the northern end of the Greenwich's business district, it occupies the southeast corner of East Putnam and Mason Streets. The building is centered on the corner, where there is a central rotunda from which four-story rectangular wings extend, with a large gymnasium/swimming pool complex set in the area between the wings. The rotunda rises above the hip roofs of the wings, topped by a shallow dome and octagonal cupola. The rounded central section has a porch area supported by Doric columns, whose ceiling is finished with Guastavino tile. Separate entrances for men and boys are set near the rotunda on each wing, framed by paired Doric columns and topped by pedimented gables.

The building was designed by M.L. and H.G. Emory, two virtually unknown architects from New York City, and built in 1916. It was a gift to the community of Mrs. Rebecca Witherell, given in memory of her late husband Nathaniel, a major local real estate magnate. Typical of YMCAs of the time, the facility offered athletic facilities, as well as short-term housing that was seen as a more wholesome alternative to seedier boarding houses of the time.

== See also ==
- National Register of Historic Places listings in Greenwich, Connecticut
