= Historic Barns of Connecticut =

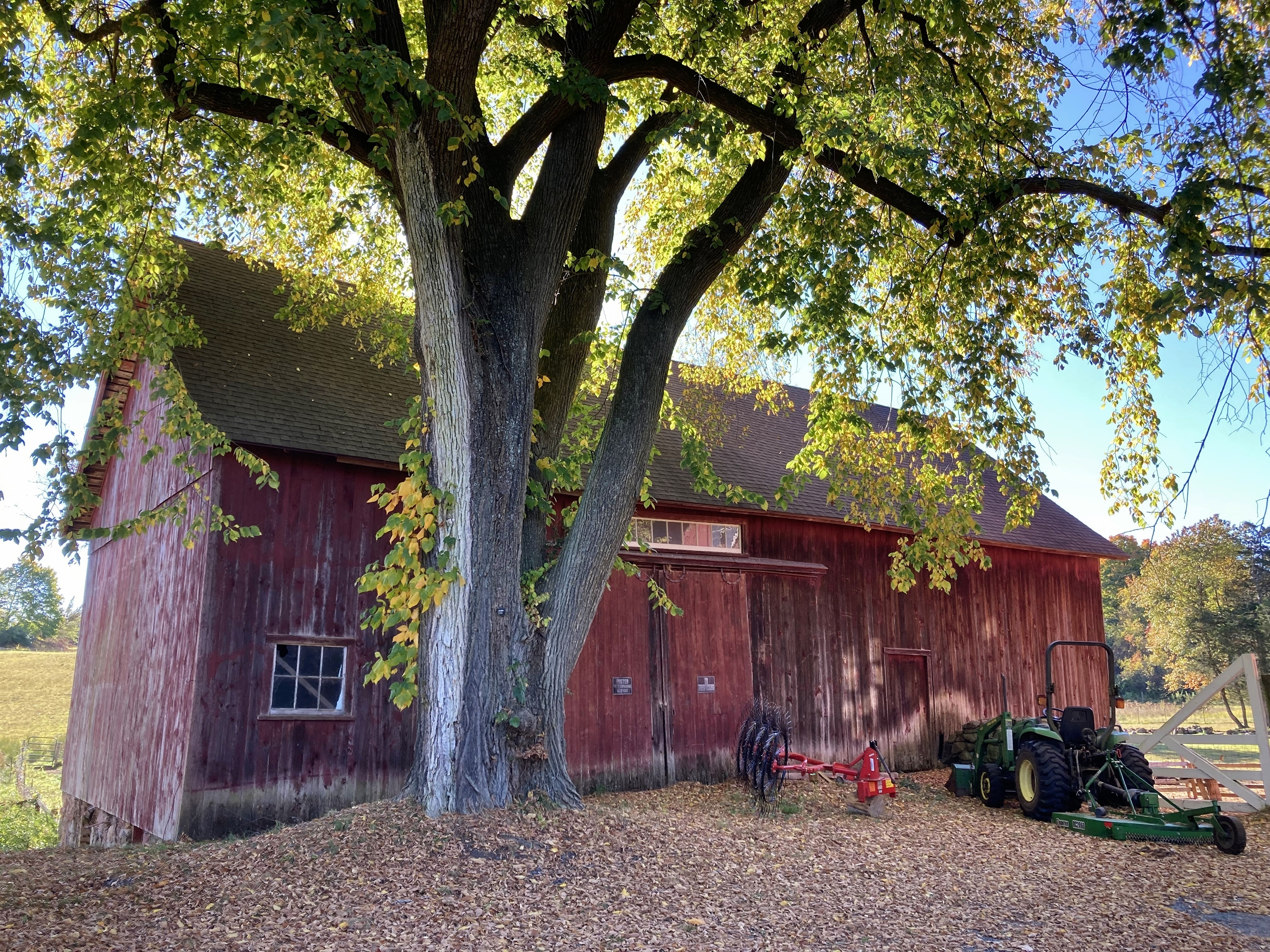
1870s horse barn at Hill-Stead Museum in Farmington, CT

Historic Barns of Connecticut is a Connecticut Trust for Historic Preservation project dedicated to the documentation and preservation of barns. The program includes a grant program and a database. The project began listing barns in 2004. By June 2011 8,200 barns had been documented in Connecticut, said project director Todd Levine. "The first step in preservation is documentation, so we need to know what we are losing to know what we need to do to protect them".

More than 2,000 selected barns have been researched and documented as part of an ongoing Historic Resource Inventory, searchable on the project's website.

In 2011 and 2012, 200 significant barns (not already identified in existing historic districts) will be chosen for in-depth research and nomination to the State Register of Historic Places.

== Photo gallery ==
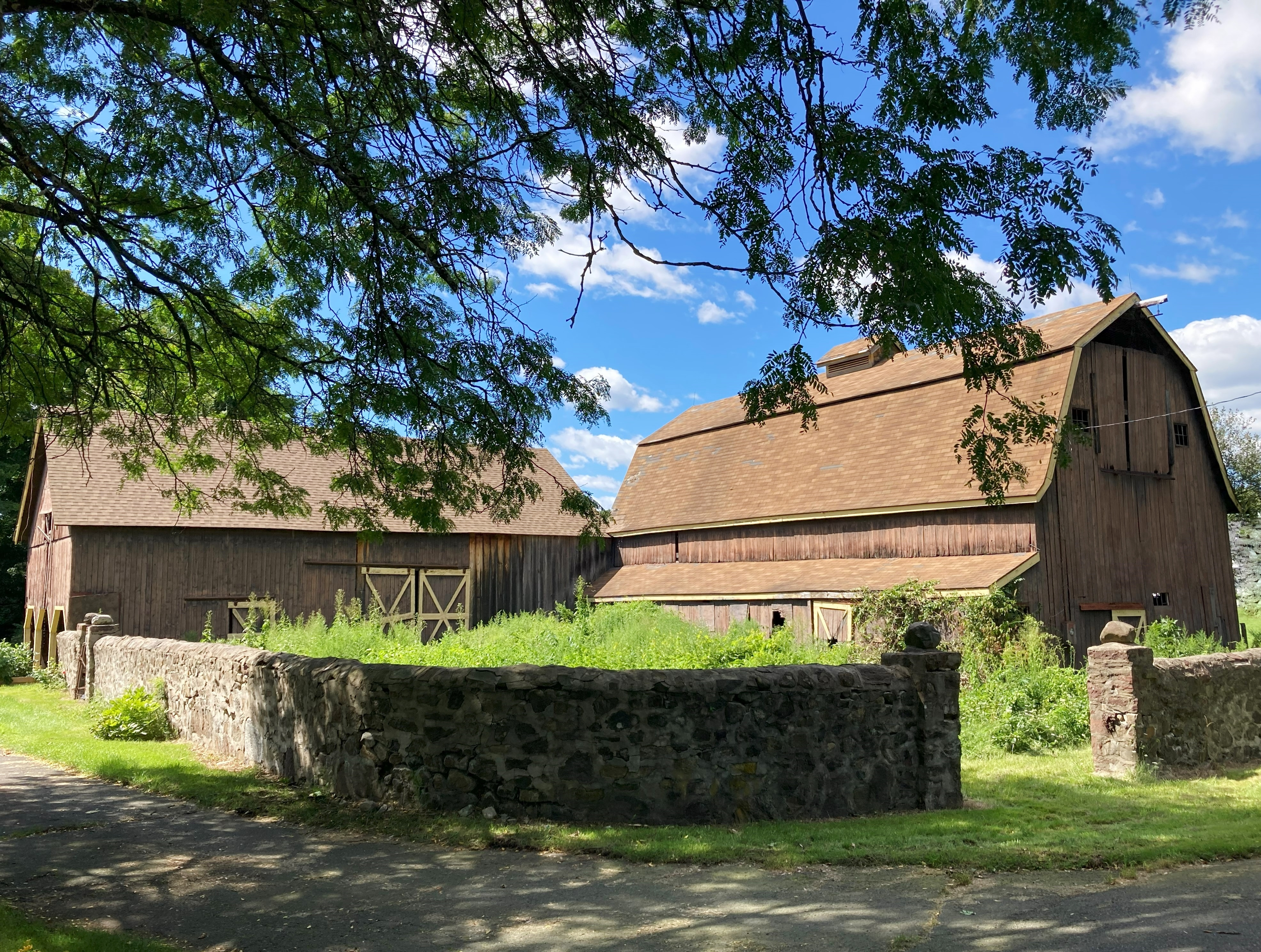
Barns dating back to the 1800s at Don Tinty Family Park in Farmington, CT

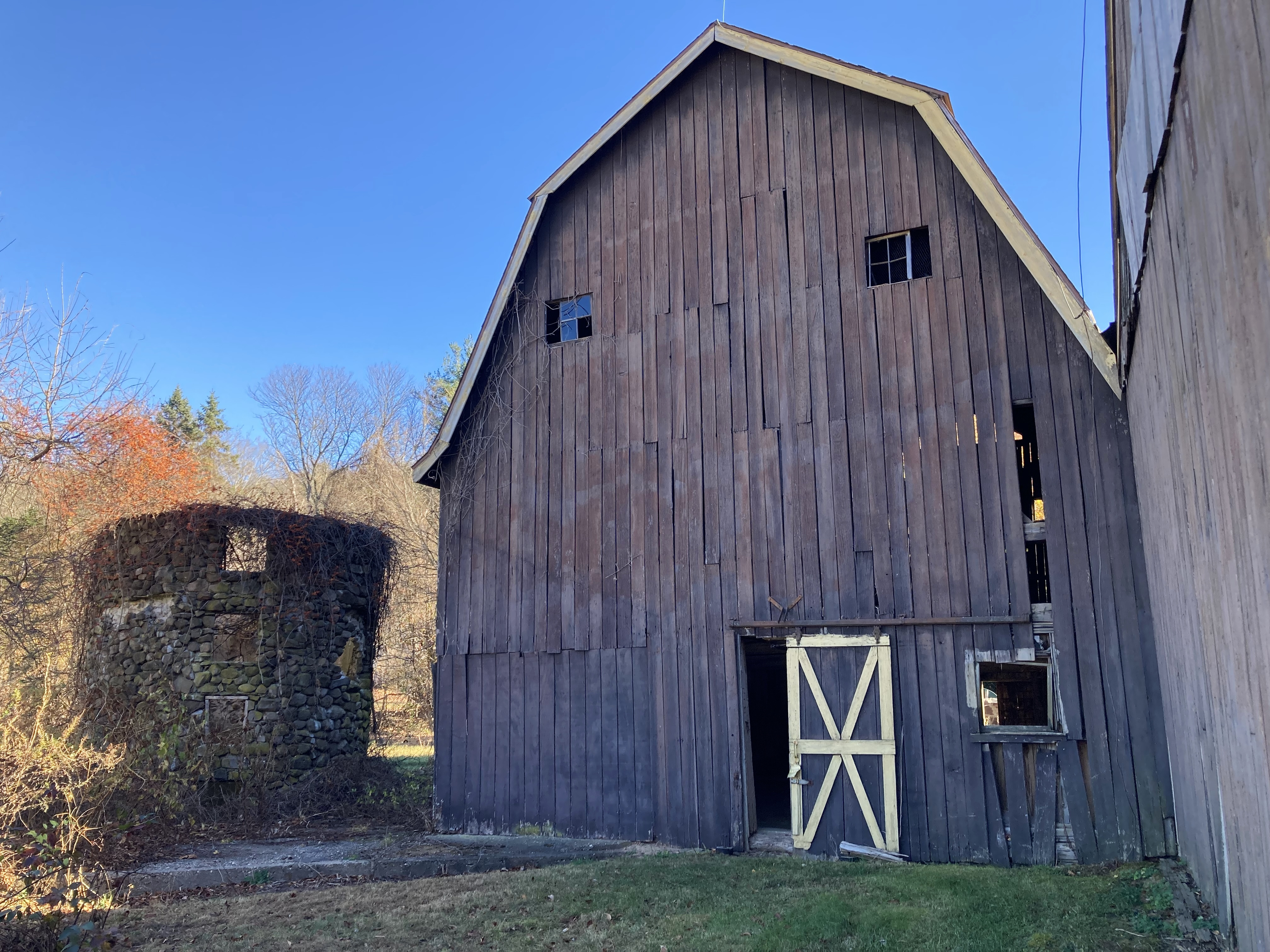
Gambrel-roofed barn and remnants of a stone silo at Don Tinty Family Park in Farmington

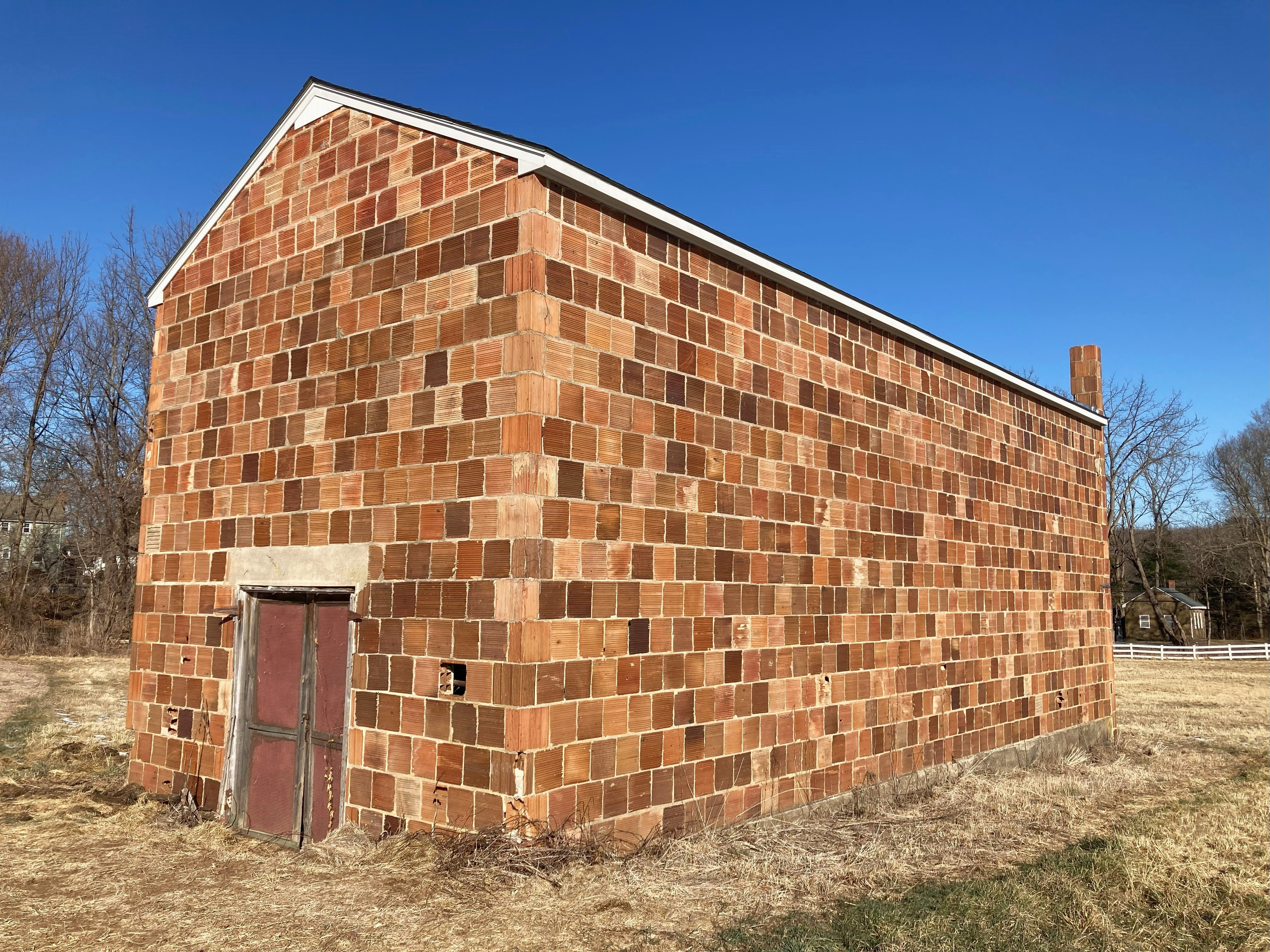
Historic mushroom barn located at Auerfarm in Bloomfield, CT

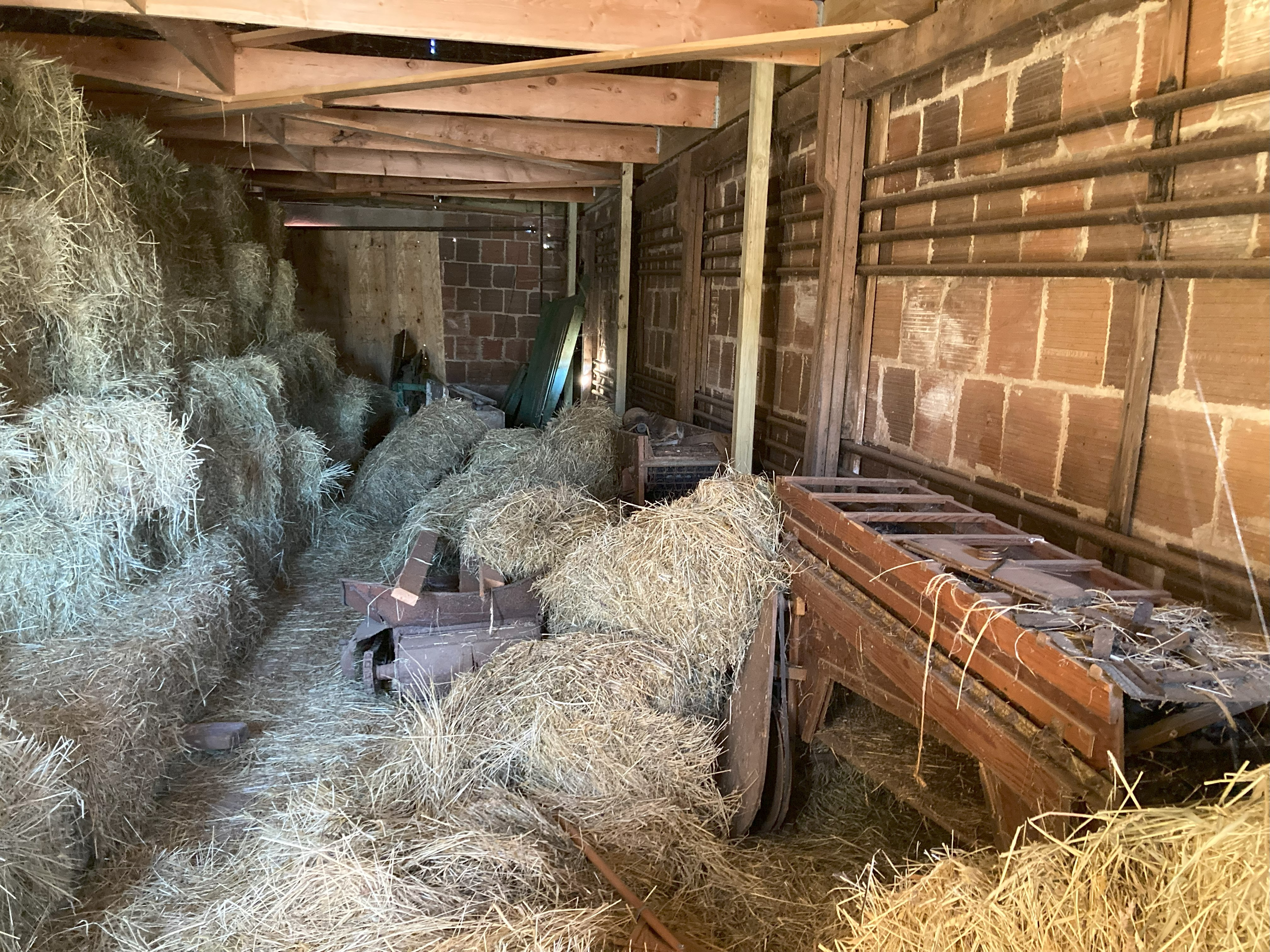
Auerfarm mushroom barn interior

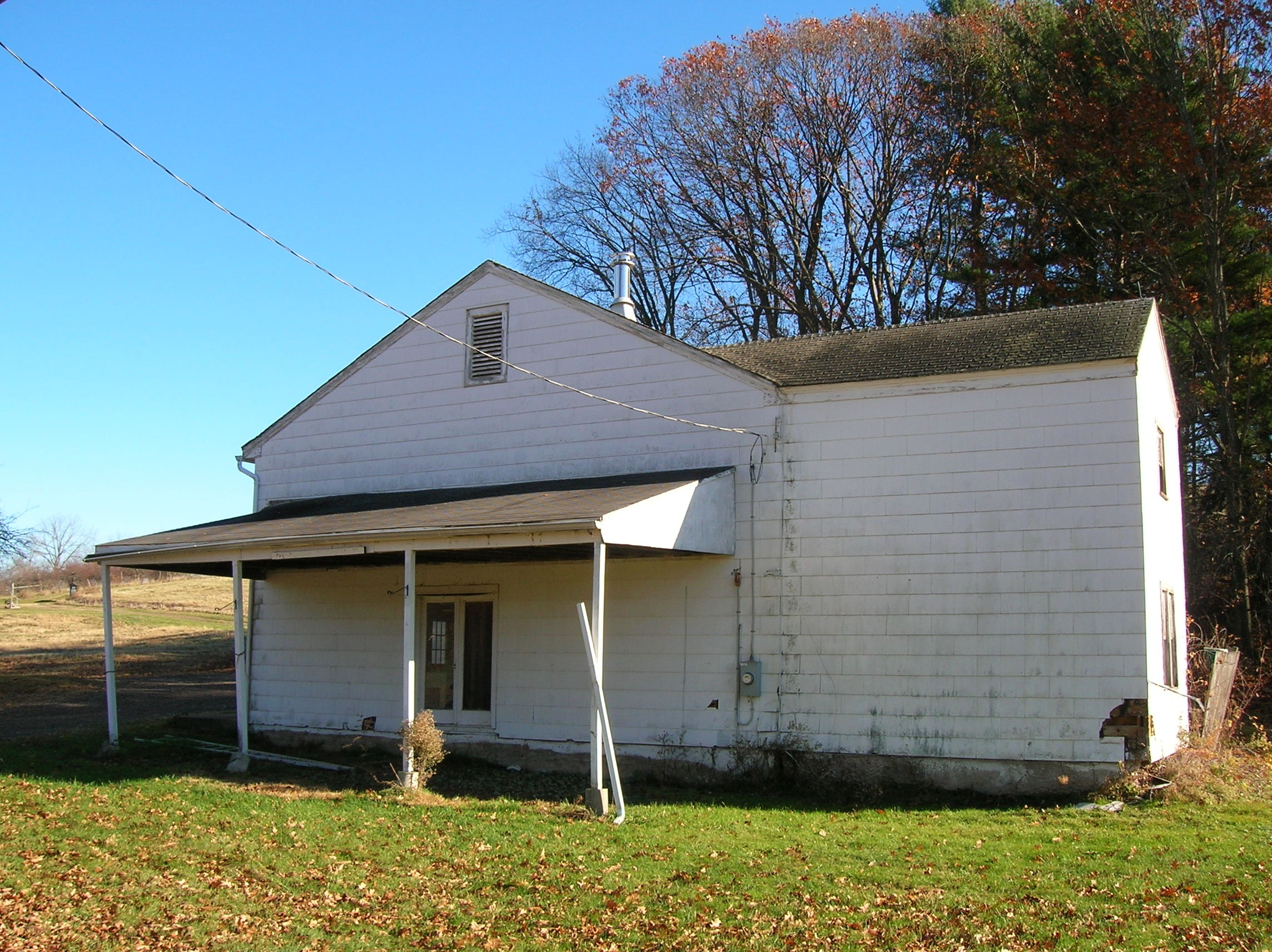
Apple barn formerly located at Auerfarm in Bloomfield (demolished)

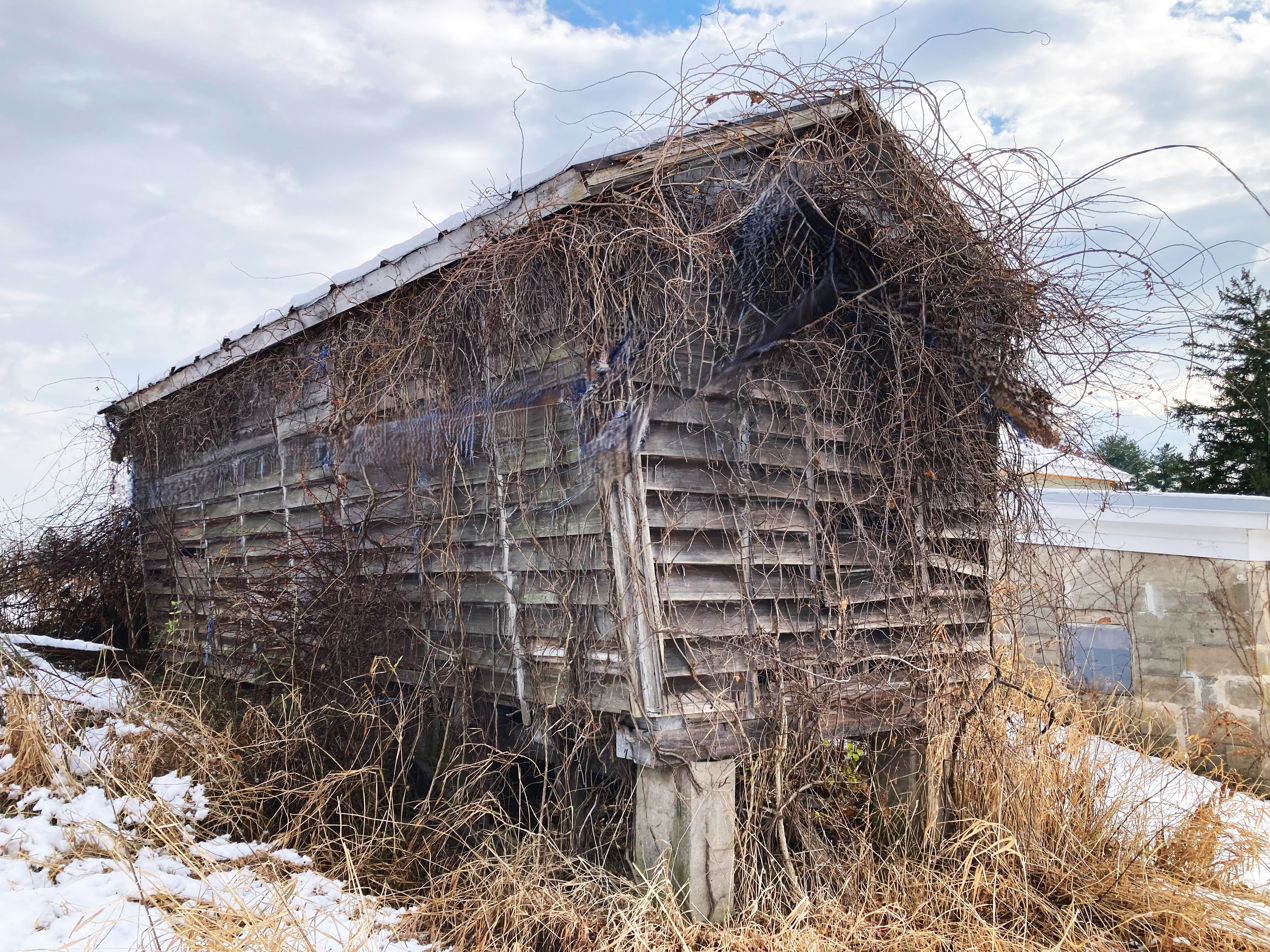
Corncrib at LaSalette Open Space near Oliver Filley House in Bloomfield, CT

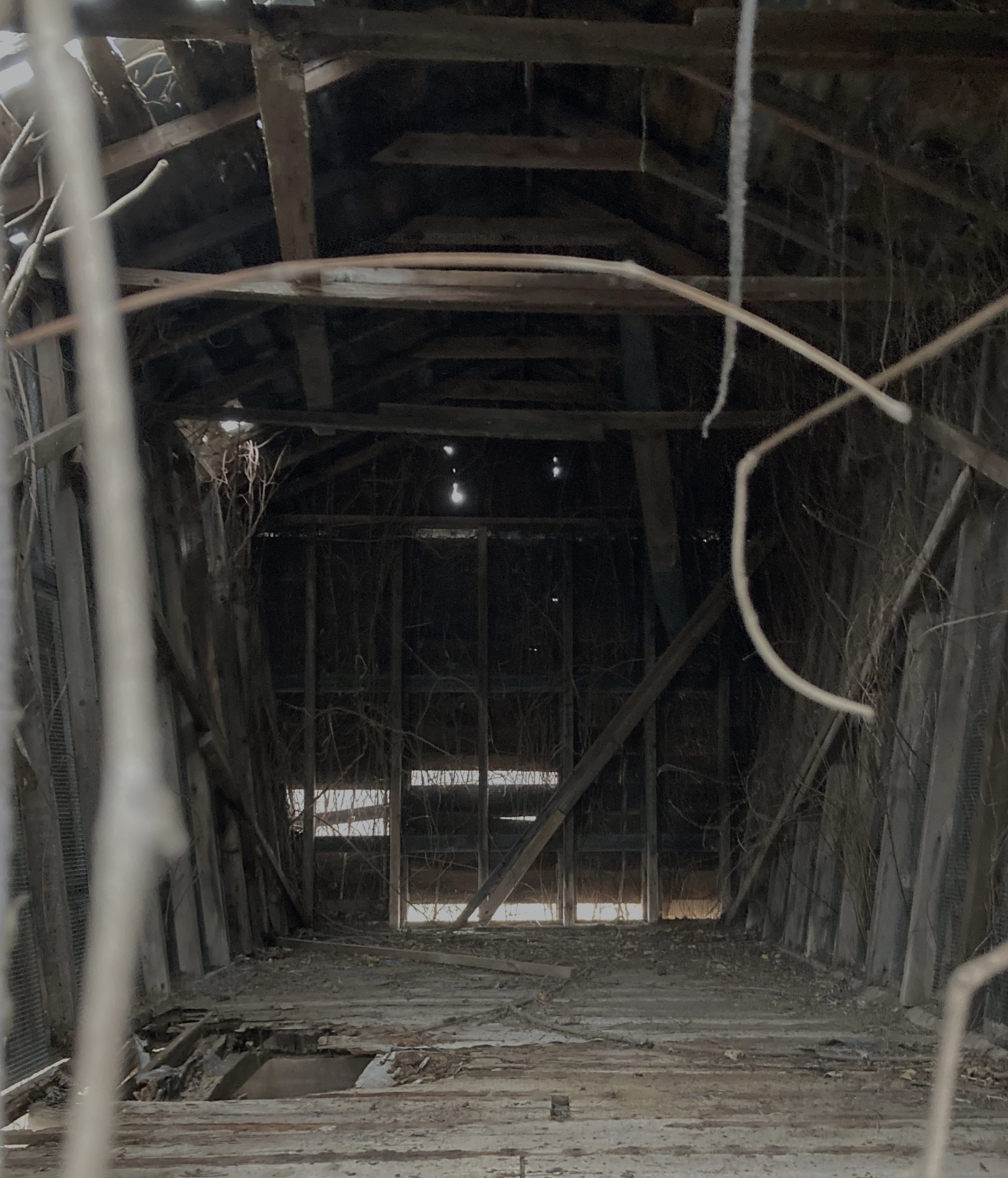
Corncrib interior at LaSalette Open Space in Bloomfield

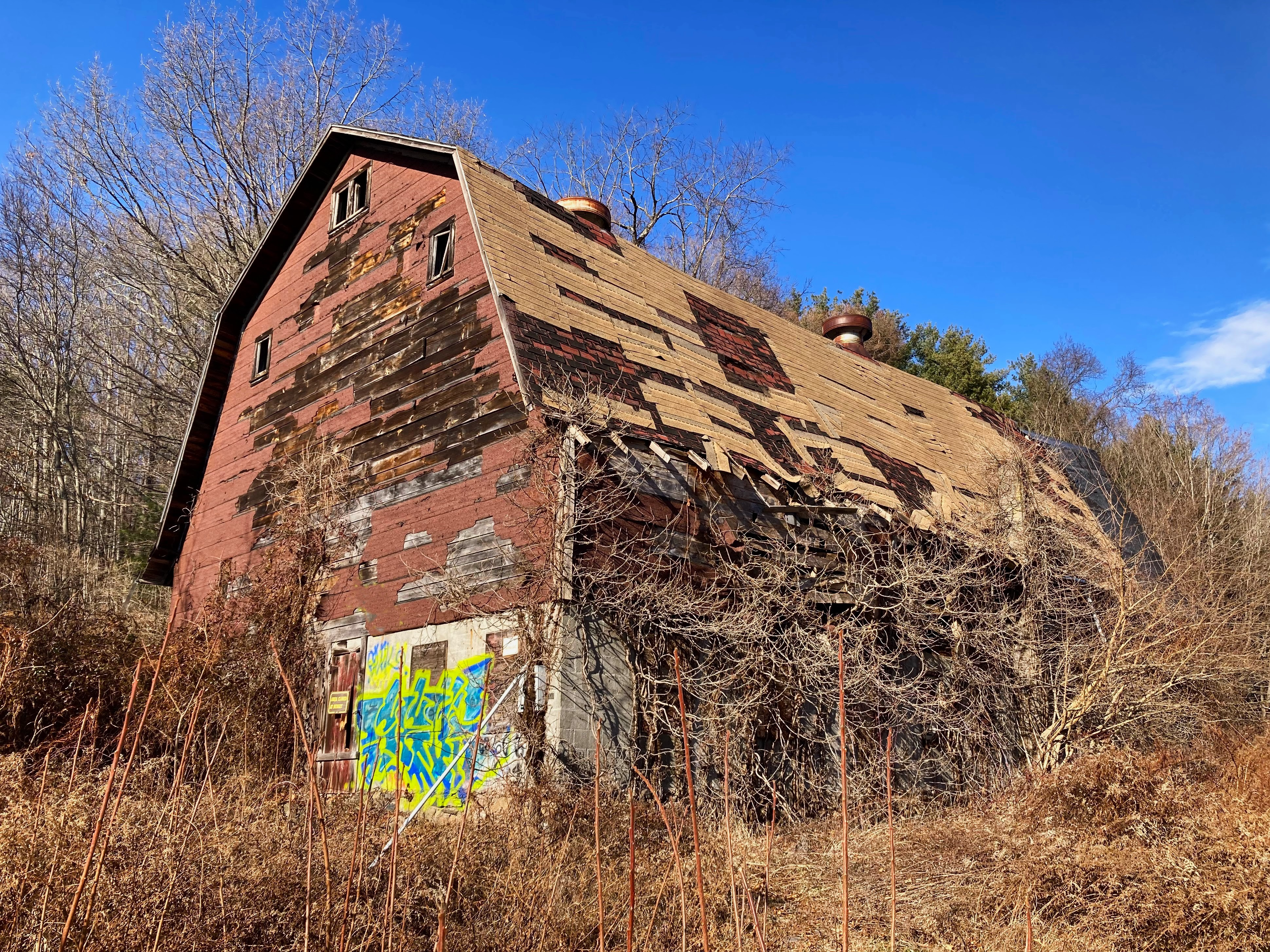
Barn at Werner's Woods, Canton, CT

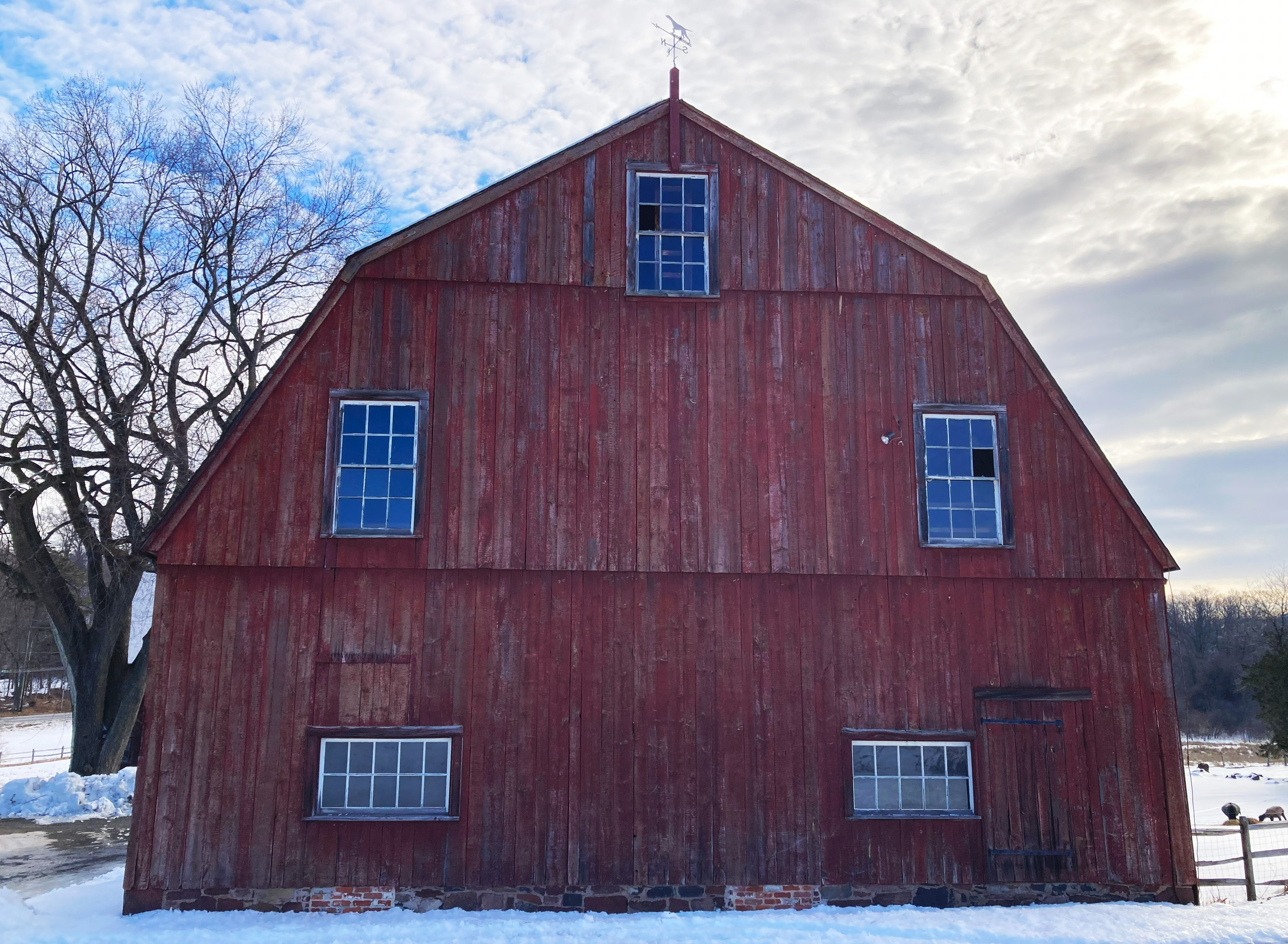
Hill-Stead (Pope-Riddle) hay barn in Farmington, CT

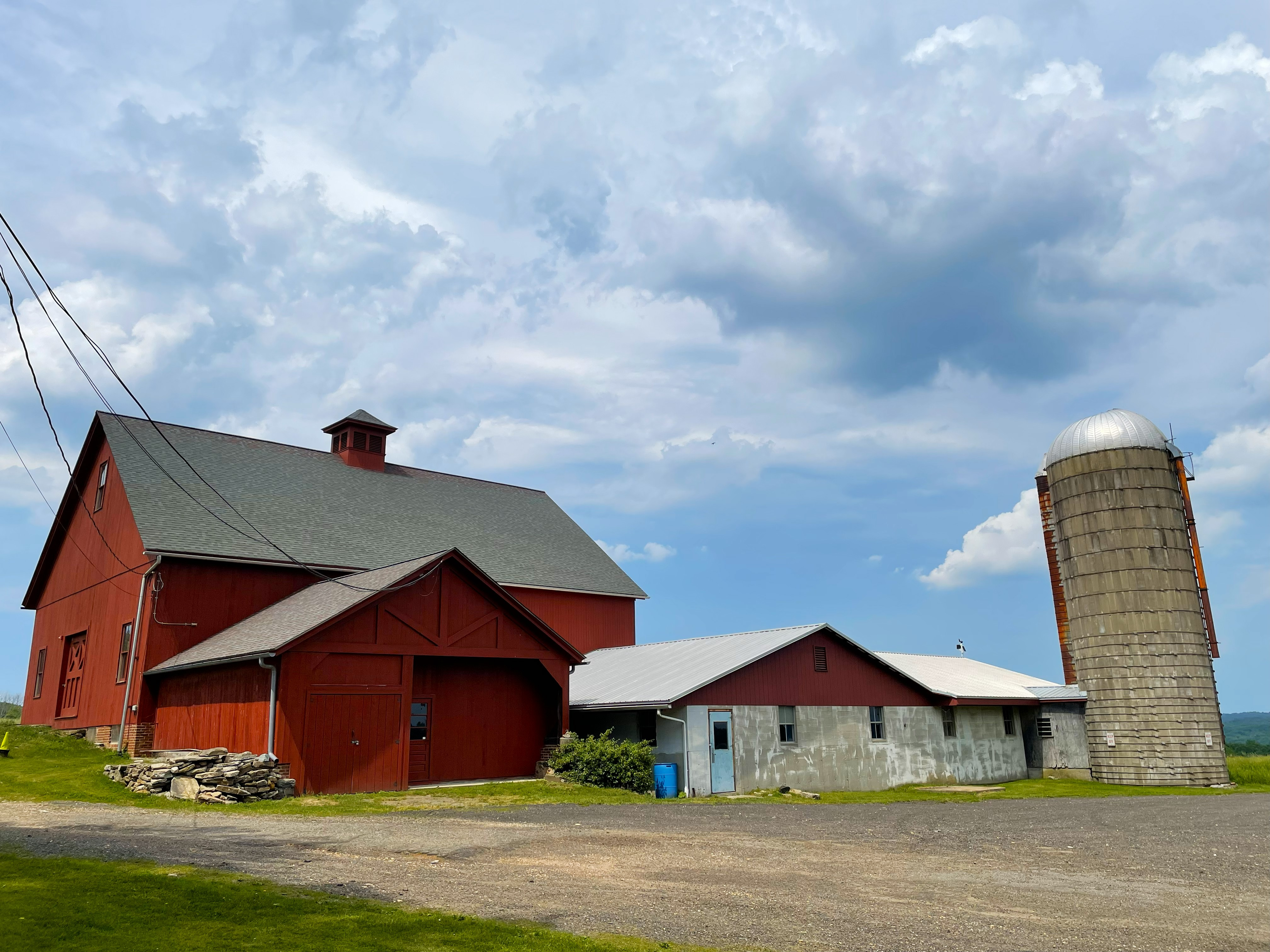
Bolton Heritage Farm, Bolton, CT

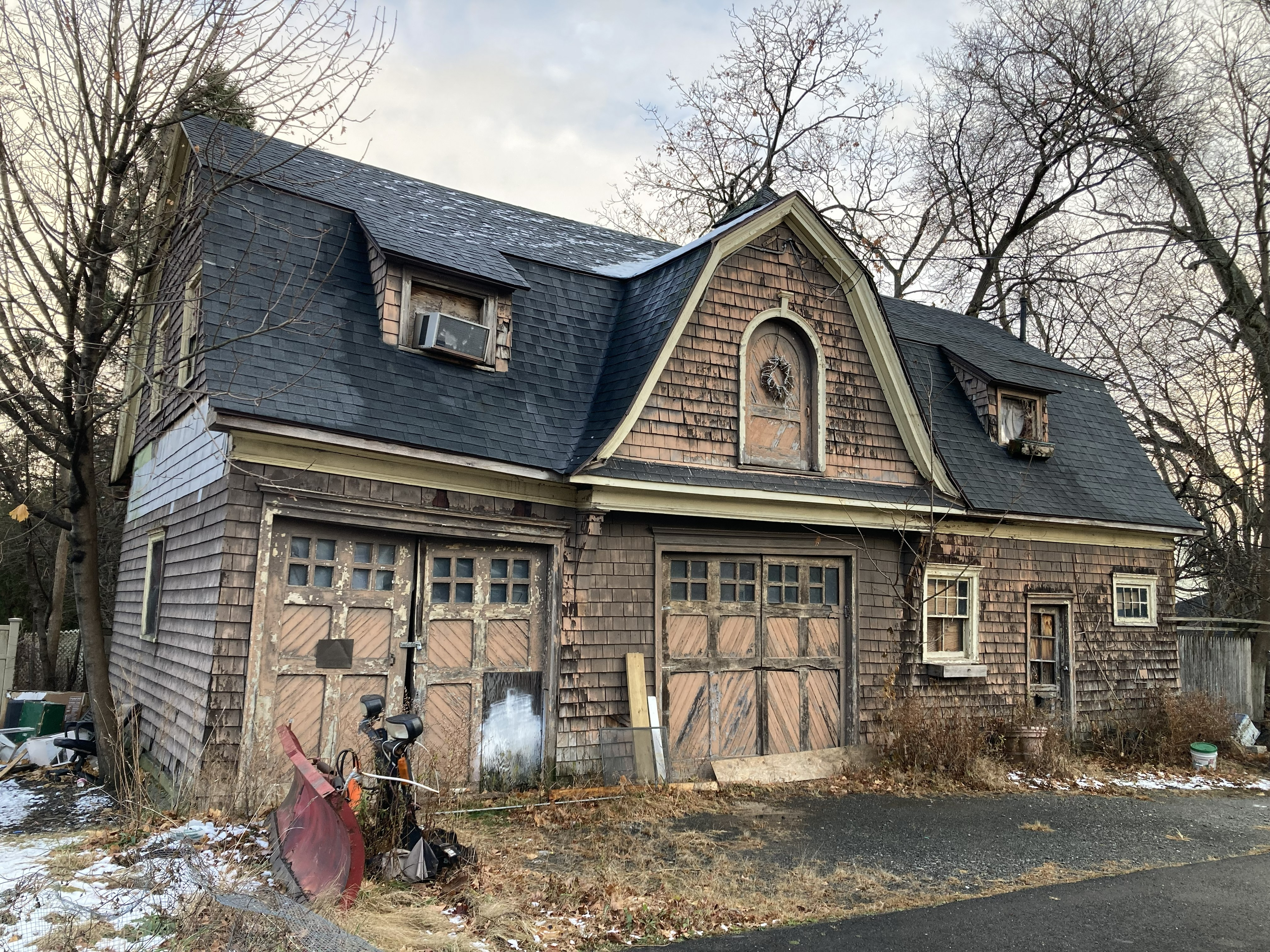
Converted historic barn in Hartford, CT
