= Blue Harbour Group =

- Industry: Investment Management
- Headquarters: Greenwich, Connecticut, United States
- Area served: Worldwide (investors); North America (investments)
- Key people: Clifton S. Robbins (Founder and CEO)
- AUM: US$ 2.1 billion (as of June 30, 2019)
- Number of employees: 18
- Website: ww.bhgrp.com

Blue Harbour Group was an American investment firm that managed capital for pension funds, endowments, sovereign wealth funds, labor unions and other institutional investors. The company was based in Greenwich, Connecticut.

Blue Harbour had an Environmental, Social and Governance (ESG) component to its investment process, and had been a signatory to the UN Principles for Responsible Investment.

== History ==
Blue Harbour Group was founded in 2004 by Clifton Robbins, also known as Cliff Robbins, a former partner at private equity giants KKR and General Atlantic.

As of June 2019, the firm managed more than $2.2 billion in capital, which it mainly invested from two funds, the long-short Blue Harbour Strategic Value Partners fund and the long-only Blue Harbour Active Ownership Partners fund. Blue Harbour’s investment team included CEO Cliff Robbins and Managing Directors Peter Carlin, Robb LeMasters, Todd Marcy and David Silverman.

On February 28, 2020, CEO and Founder Clifton S. Robbins announced that he would be closing Blue Harbour Group, which had $2 billion of assets under management, to set up a family office. He informed investors that Blue Harbour intended to return all investors' capital later in the year and close the funds.

== Investment strategy ==
Blue Harbour took ownership stakes in publicly traded companies whose management teams were looking to increase in value. Blue Harbour focused on North American undervalued smallcap and midcap companies.

== Awards ==
In 2013, Business Insider named Blue Harbour Strategic Value Partners as one of “The 30 Hedge Funds That Crushed Wall Street in 2013.”

Blue Harbour Group won the 2016 "Best U.S. Activist Hedge Fund Manager" by Hedgeweek, and the 2017 Hedge Fund Industry Awards' "Activist Hedge Fund Manager of the Year" by Institutional Investor.
