= Greenwich, Connecticut =

Greenwich
- Town
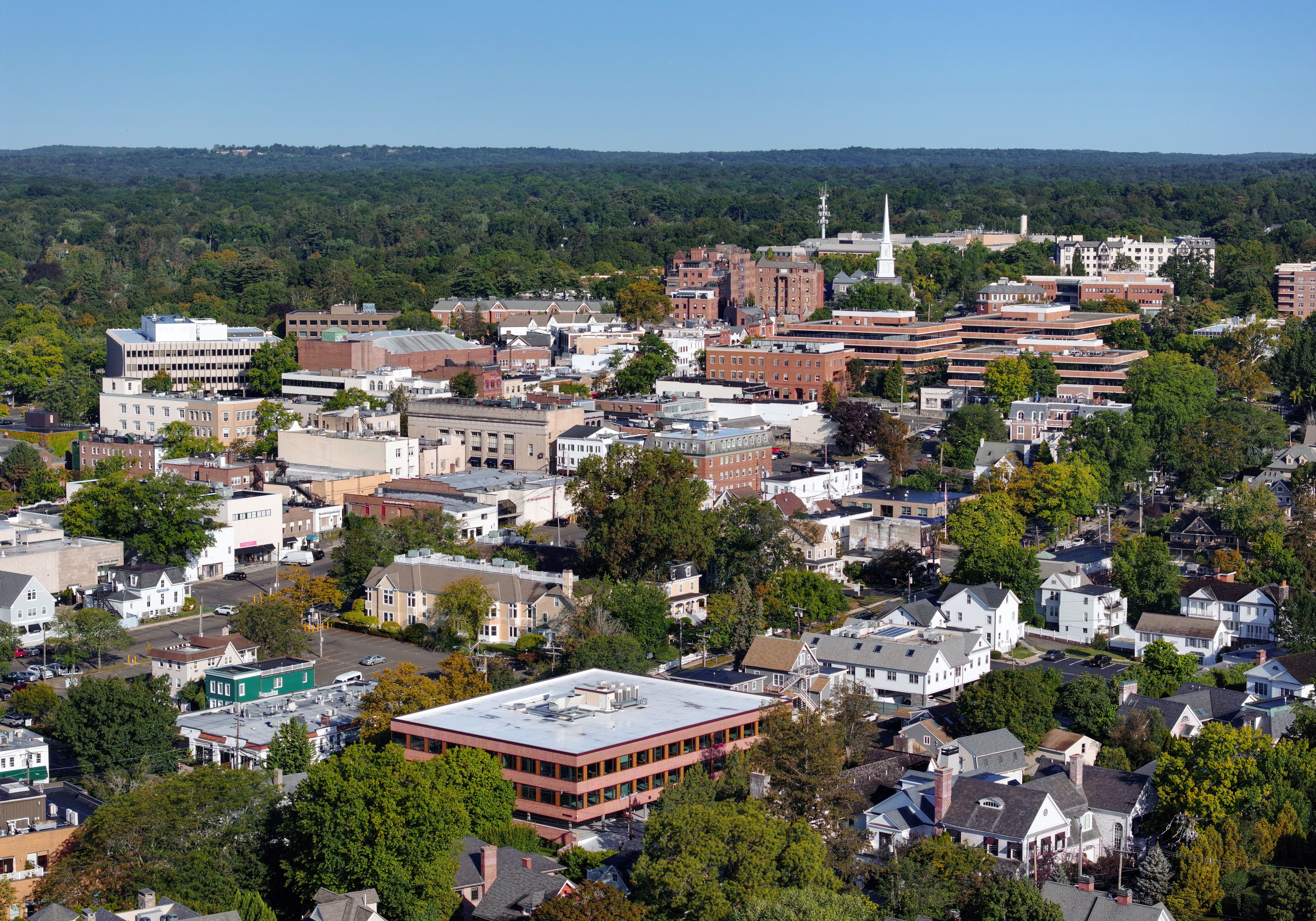
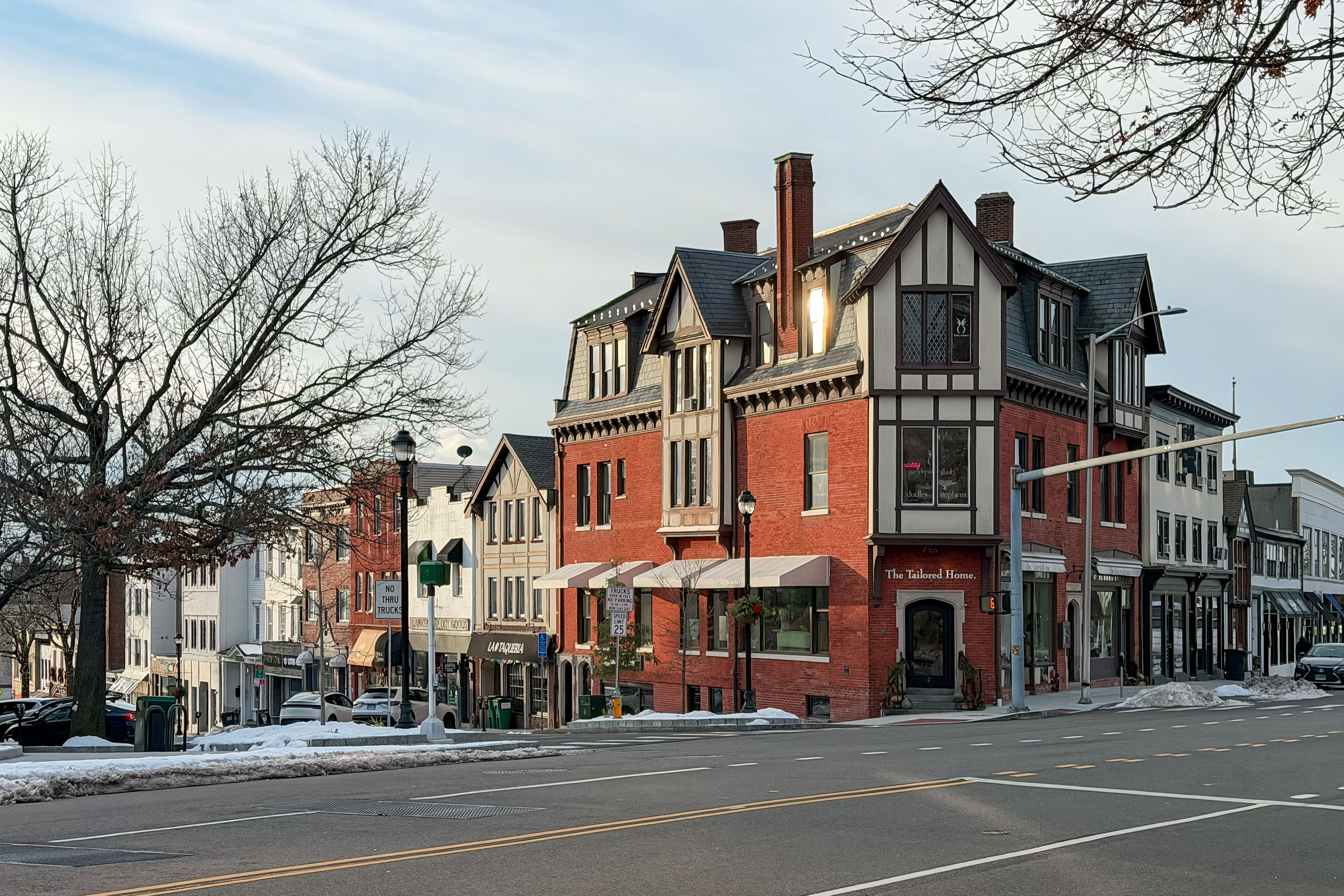
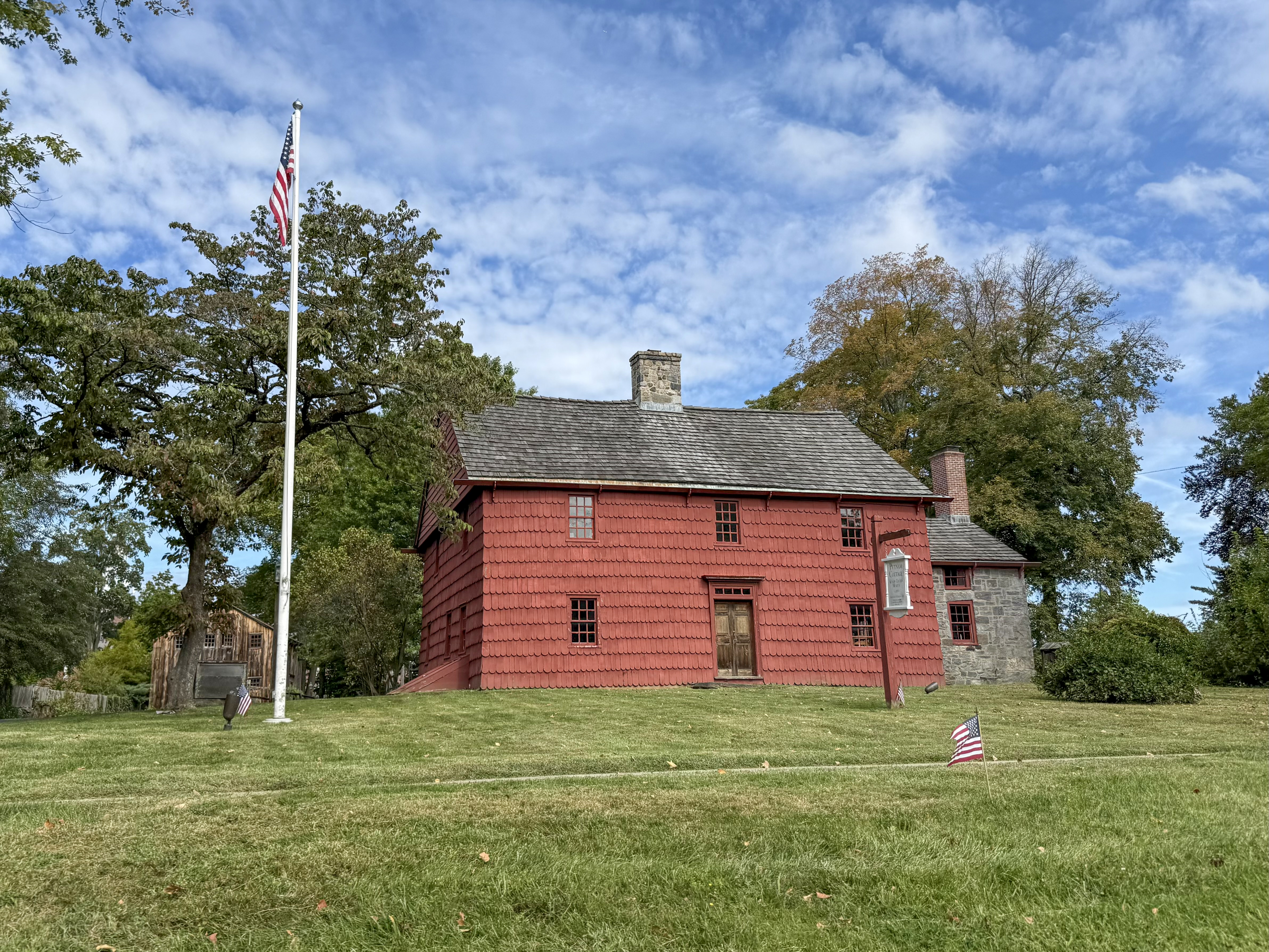
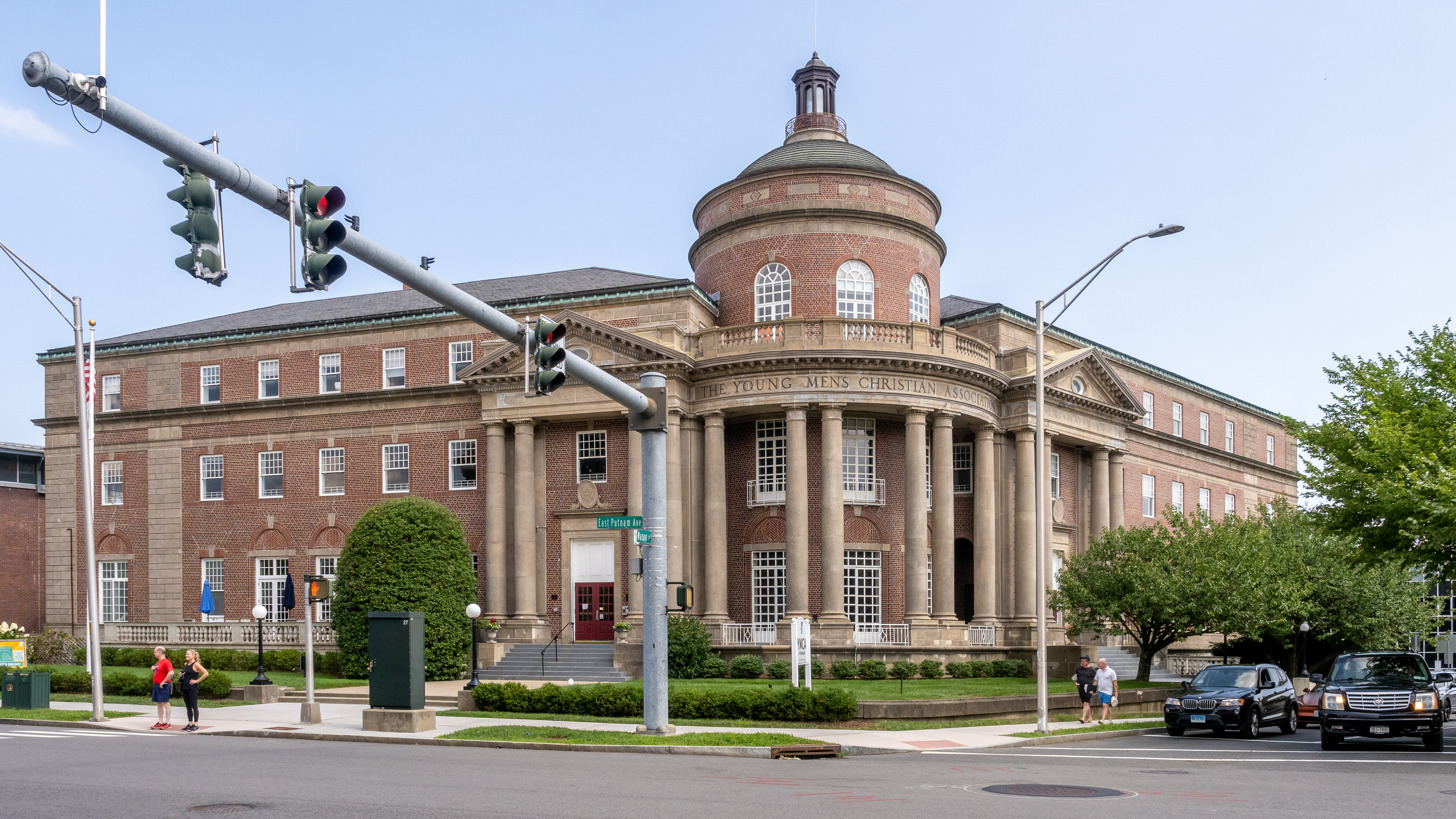
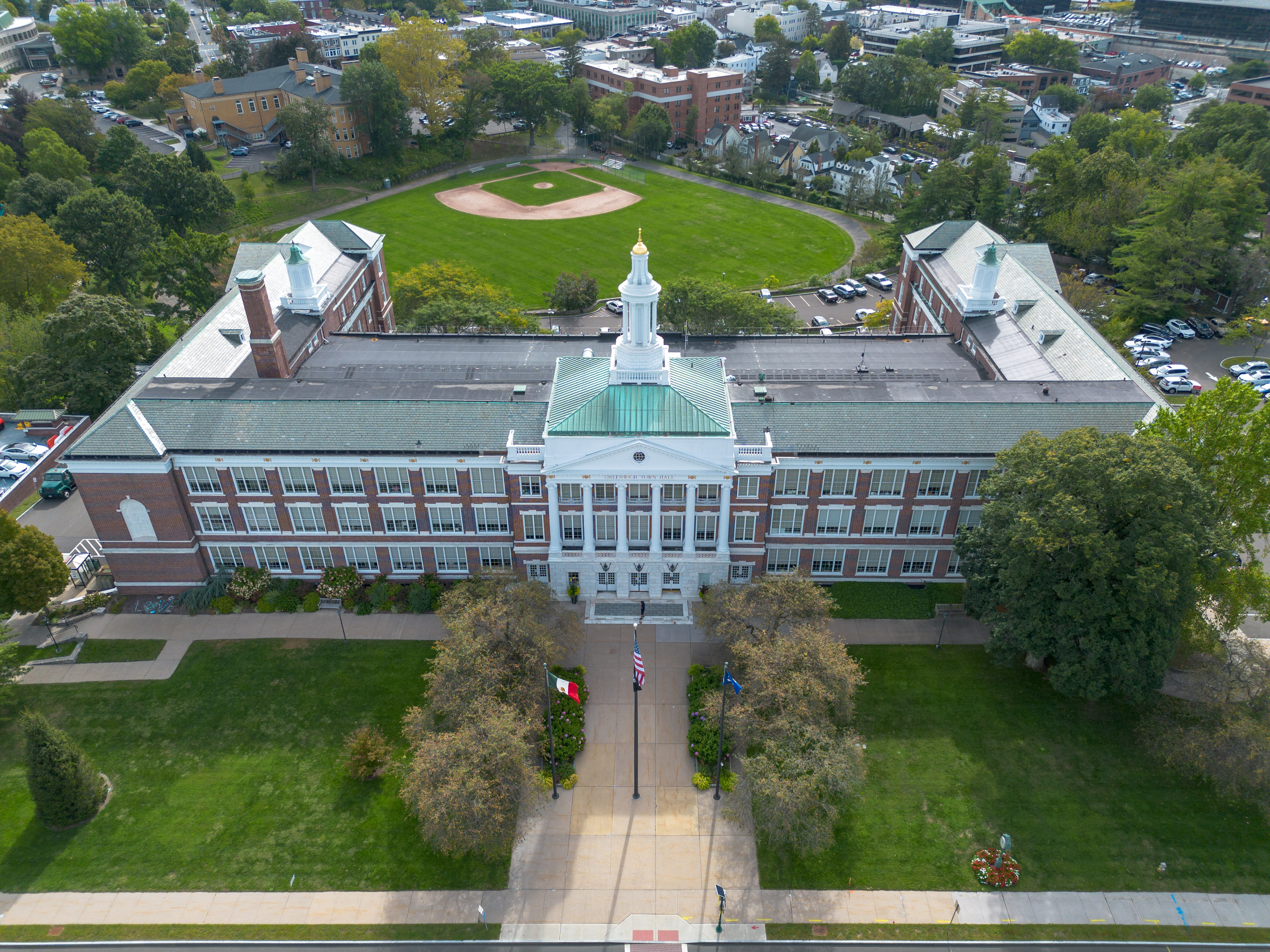
- Skyline Historic District Putnam Cottage Greenwich YMCA Town Hall

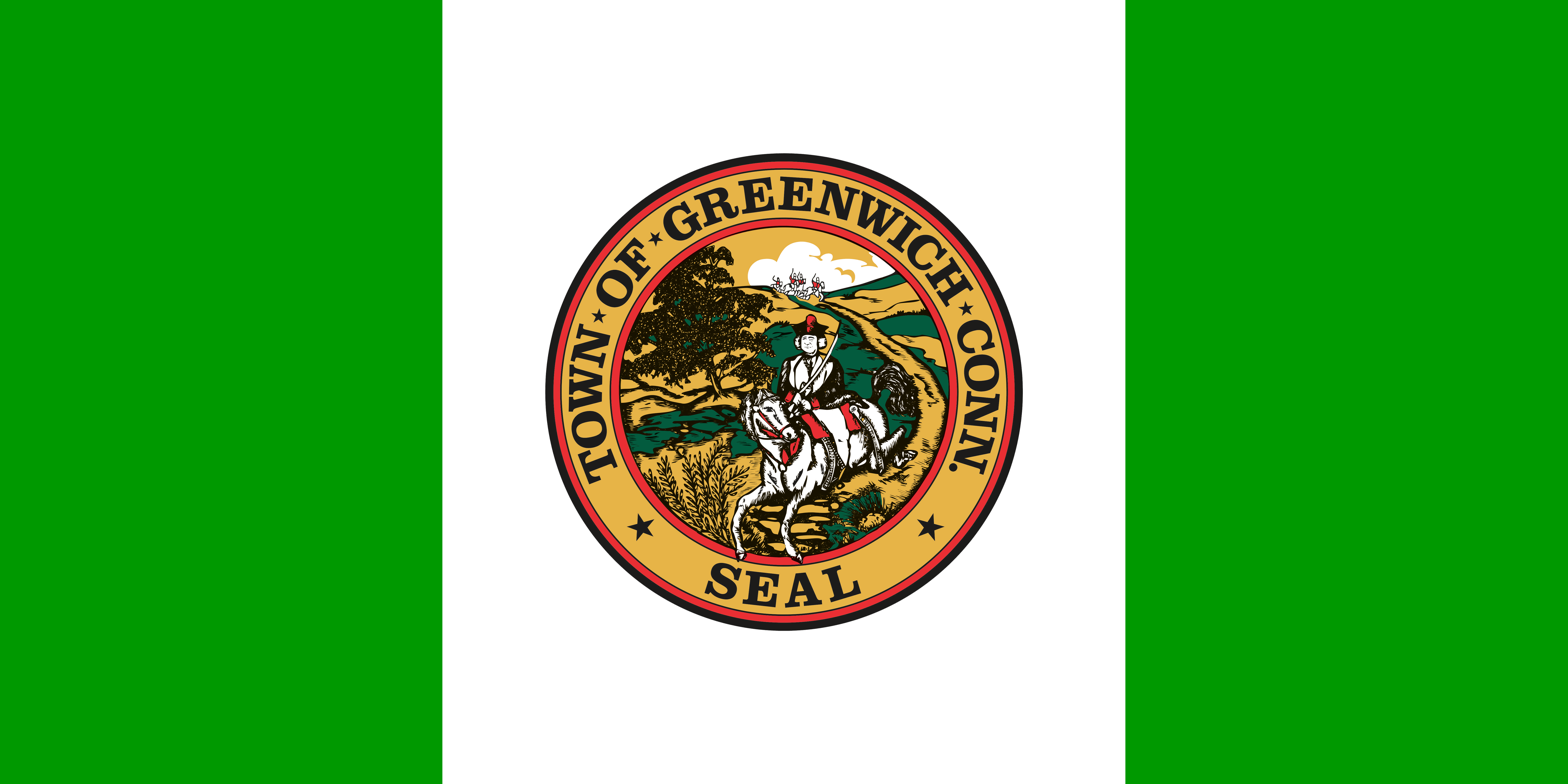
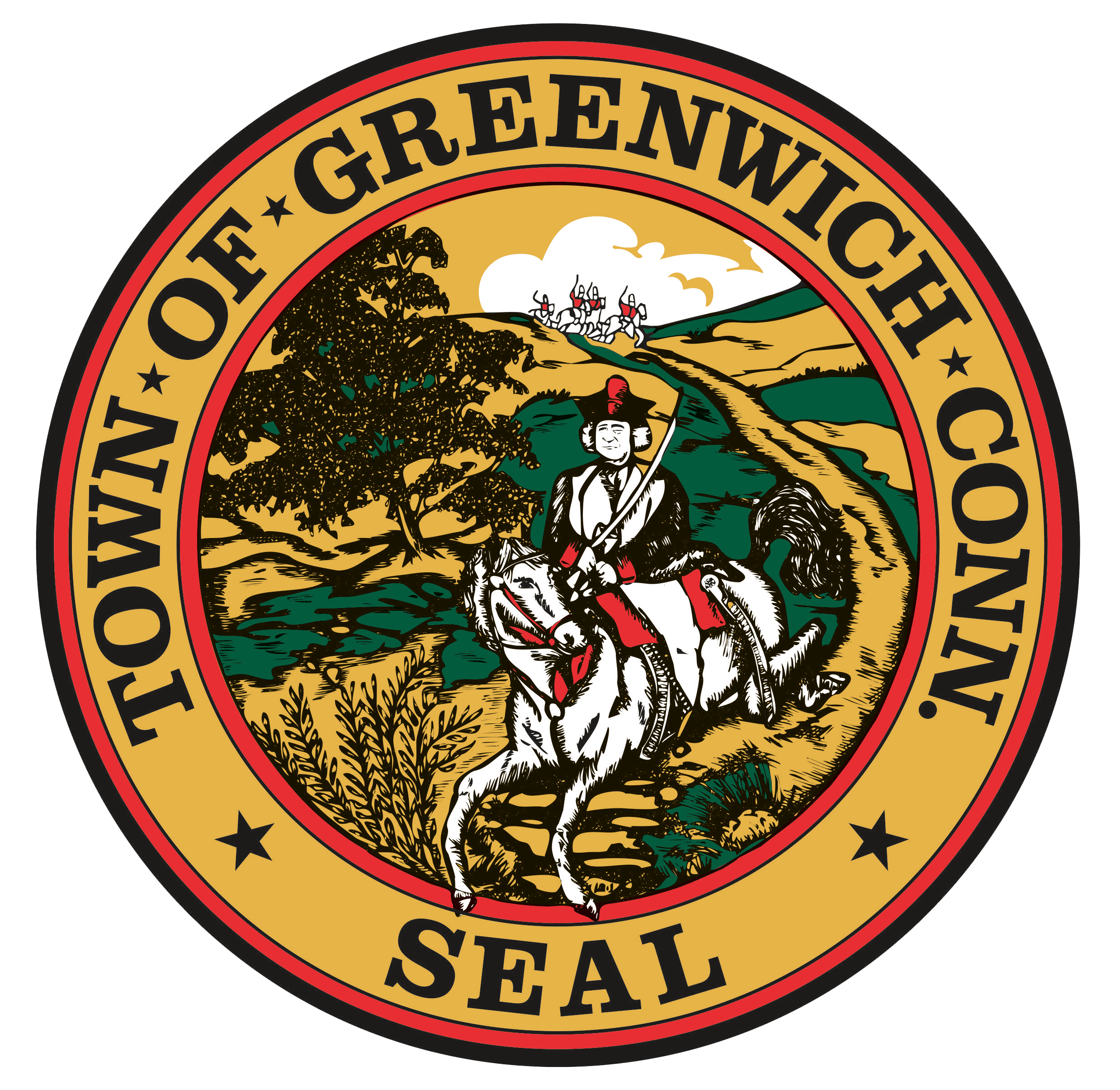
- Flag Seal Logo

- Coordinates: 41°02′50″N 73°37′20″W
- Country: United States
- U.S. state: Connecticut
- County: Fairfield
- Region: Western CT
- Settled: 1640
- Joined Connecticut: 1656
- Named for: Greenwich, London

Government
  - Type: Representative town meeting
  - First selectman: Fred Camillo (R)
  - Selectwoman: Lauren Rabin (R), Rachel Khanna (D)
  - Town administrator: Kathleen Clarke Buch
  - Town meeting moderator: Alexis Voulgaris

Area
  - Total: 67.2 sq mi (174.0 km^{2})
  - Land: 47.8 sq mi (123.8 km^{2})
  - Water: 19.4 sq mi (50.3 km^{2}) 28.88%
- Elevation: 135 ft (41 m)

Population (2020)
  - Total: 63,518
  - Density: 1,328.8/sq mi (513.1/km^{2})
- Demonym: Greenwichite
- Time zone: UTC−5 (Eastern)
  - Summer (DST): UTC−4 (Eastern)
- ZIP Codes: 06830, 06831, 06870, 06878
- Area codes: 203/475
- FIPS code: 09-33620
- GNIS feature ID: 213435
- Website: www.greenwichct.gov

Greenwich (/ˈɡrɛnɪtʃ/ GREN-itch) is a town in southwestern Fairfield County, Connecticut, United States. As of the 2020 census, it had a population of 63,518. It is the largest town on Connecticut's Gold Coast. Greenwich is the location of many hedge funds and financial services firms due to its residential setting and proximity to Manhattan.

Greenwich is a principal community of the Bridgeport–Stamford–Norwalk–Danbury metropolitan statistical area, which comprises all of Fairfield County, and is part of both the greater New York metropolitan area and the Western Connecticut Planning Region. The town is the southwesternmost municipality in both the State of Connecticut and the six-state region of New England. The town is named after Greenwich, a royal borough of London in the United Kingdom.

== History ==
The town of Greenwich was settled in 1640 by the agents Robert Feake and Captain Daniel Patrick, from Watertown, Massachusetts, who purchased, on behalf of New Haven Colony, the land from the Siwanoy Indians in exchange of 25 English coats. One of the founders was Elizabeth Fones Winthrop Feake, daughter-in-law of John Winthrop, founder and governor of the Massachusetts Bay Colony. It was named after Greenwich, near London. What is now called Greenwich Point was known for much of the area's early history as "Elizabeth's Neck" in recognition of Elizabeth Fones and the 1640 purchase of the Point and much of the area now known as Old Greenwich. Greenwich was declared a township by the Connecticut General Assembly in Hartford on May 11, 1665.

During the American Revolution, General Israel Putnam made a daring escape from the British on February 26, 1779, in Greenwich. Although British forces captured and sacked the town, Putnam was able to warn Stamford.

In 1974, Gulliver's Restaurant and Bar, on the border of Greenwich and Port Chester, burned, killing 24 young people.

In 1983, the Mianus River Bridge, which carries traffic on Interstate 95 over an estuary, collapsed, resulting in the death of three people.

For many years, Greenwich Point (locally termed "Tod's Point"), was open only to town residents and their guests. However, a lawyer sued, saying his rights to freedom of assembly were threatened because he was not allowed to go there. The lower courts disagreed, but the Supreme Court of Connecticut agreed, and Greenwich was forced to amend its beach access policy to all four beaches in 2001. These beaches include Greenwich Point Park, Island Beach, Great Captain Island, and Byram Park.

== Geography ==
According to the United States Census Bureau in 2000, the town had a total area of 67.2 square miles (174 km^{2}), of which 47.8 square miles (124 km^{2}) is land and 19.4 square miles (50 km^{2}), or 28.88%, is water. In terms of area, Greenwich is twice the size of Manhattan. The town is bordered to the west by Port Chester and Rye Brook, while to the north, it is bordered by North Castle, all of which are in New York. To the south, it is bordered by the Long Island Sound. To the east, it is bordered by Stamford, which is also in Connecticut.

=== Neighborhoods and sections ===
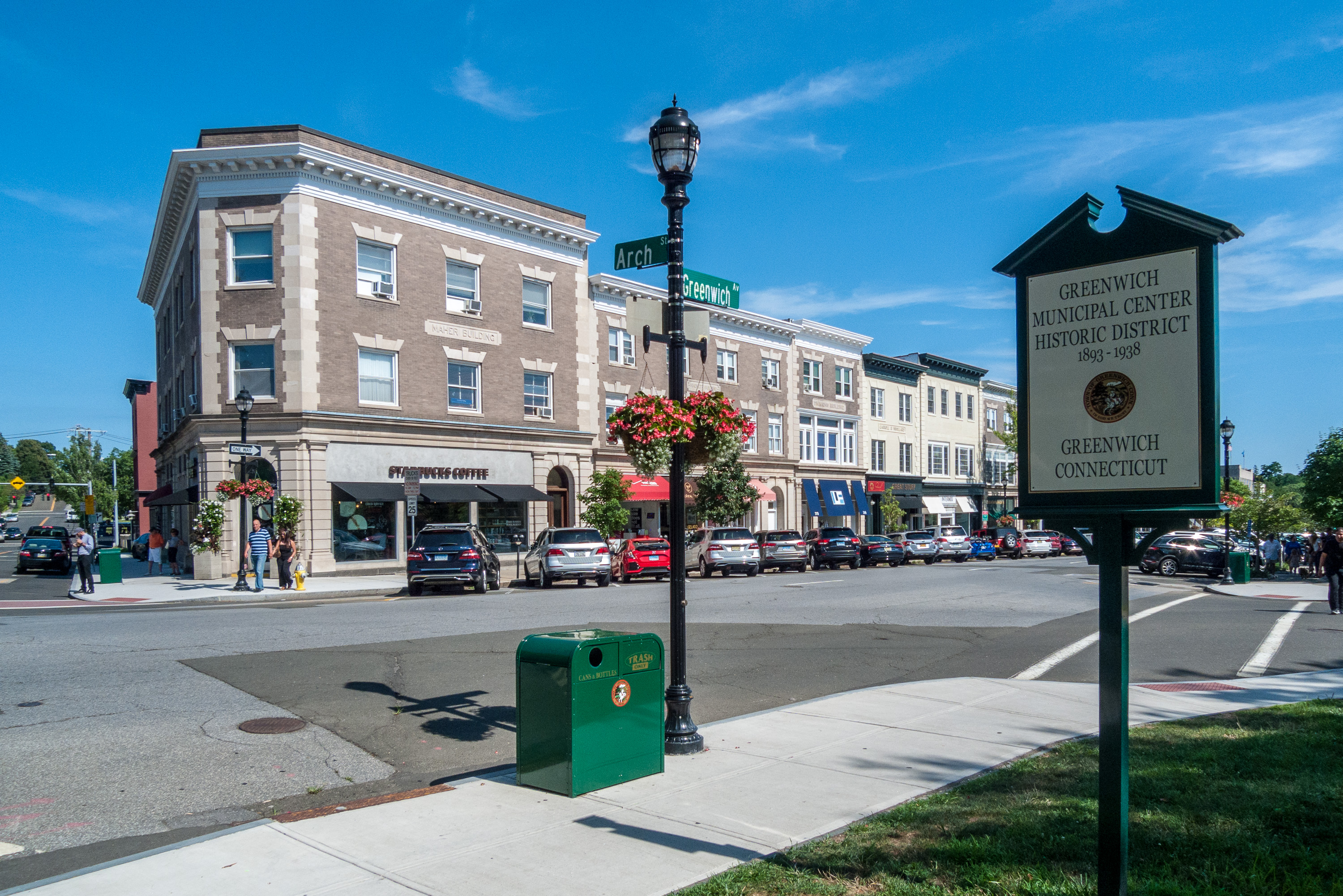
Greenwich Municipal Center Historic District, Fairfield County, Connecticut

The U.S. Census Bureau recognizes nine CDPs within the town: Byram, Cos Cob, Glenville, Indian Field, Old Greenwich, Pemberwick, Riverside, Rock Ridge and the Greenwich CDP covering the historic municipal center of the town. The USPS lists separate zip codes for "Greenwich" (spanning two zip codes), Cos Cob, Old Greenwich, and Riverside, for a total of five zip codes, plus a sixth zip code for PO Box. Additionally, Greenwich is often further divided into several smaller, unofficial neighborhoods.

Greenwich's Hispanic and Latin American population is concentrated in the southwestern corner of the town.

- Back Country
- Banksville (Connecticut side)
- Belle Haven
- Bruce Park
- Byram
- Chickahominy
- Cos Cob
- Edgewood
- Fourth Ward (Fourth Ward Historic District)
- Glenville
- Downtown/Central Greenwich
- Greenwich Cove
- Holly Hill
- Mianus
- Mid-Country
- Milbank
- Milbrook
- Municipal Center District
- North Mianus
- North Street (refers to the neighborhood surrounding North Street)
- Old Greenwich (Sound Beach)
- Palmer Hill
- Pemberwick
- Pine Hill
- Riverbank
- Riverside
- Riversville
- Rock Ridge
- Round Hill
- Stanwich

==== Historical sites ====
- Bush-Holley House
- Putnam Cottage
- Thomas Lyon House
- Silas Edward Mead House

=== Islands ===
Calf Island is a 29-acre (120,000 m^{2}) island about 3,000 feet (910 m) from the Byram shore in Greenwich.

More than half of the island (on the west side) is a bird sanctuary off-limits to members of the public without permission to visit. As of 2006 the island is available for overnight stays for those with permits, otherwise the east side is open from dawn until dusk.

Great Captain Island is also off the coast of Greenwich, and includes the southernmost point in Connecticut. There is a U.S. Coast Guard lighthouse on this island, as well as a designated area as a bird sanctuary. The lighthouse is a skeletal tower.

Island Beach or "Little Captain Island" once was the venue for the town's annual Island Beach Day. Ventriloquist Paul Winchell and his dummy, Jerry Mahoney, once came for a show, and on another occasion the Connecticut National Guard let adults and children fire machine guns into the water, according to an article in the Greenwich Time.

Island Beach has changed over the decades. The bathhouse once on the island's eastern shore is gone, and erosion is slowly eating away at the beaches themselves.

=== Climate ===
Greenwich experiences a humid continental climate (Dfa); however, it is quite close to a humid subtropical climate (Köppen climate classification Cfa). During winter storms, it is common for the area north of the Merritt Parkway to receive significantly heavier snowfall than the area closer to the coast, due to the moderating influence of Long Island Sound. Tempatures range from −6 °C or 21 °F to 28 °C or 82 °F. Rainfall is more common in March to May, with rainfall reaching 120 mm (4.7 in) in March, despite this, the difference in rainfall is no more than a 38 millimeter (or 1.5 inch) difference.

Climate data for Greenwich, Connecticut
Month	Jan	Feb	Mar	Apr	May	Jun	Jul	Aug	Sep	Oct	Nov	Dec	Year
Mean daily maximum °F (°C)	35 (2)	39 (4)	47 (8)	58 (14)	69 (21)	77 (25)	82 (28)	80 (27)	73 (23)	62 (17)	51 (11)	40 (4)	59 (15)
Mean daily minimum °F (°C)	21 (−6)	23 (−5)	29 (−2)	39 (4)	49 (9)	59 (15)	64 (18)	63 (17)	55 (13)	44 (7)	36 (2)	27 (−3)	42 (6)
Average precipitation inches (mm)	4.32 (110)	3.24 (82)	4.73 (120)	4.44 (113)	4.58 (116)	3.77 (96)	3.72 (94)	4.00 (102)	4.70 (119)	4.17 (106)	4.47 (114)	4.31 (109)	50.45 (1,281)
Average snowfall inches (cm)	7.7 (20)	8.3 (21)	4.9 (12)	1.2 (3.0)	0 (0)	0 (0)	0 (0)	0 (0)	0 (0)	0 (0)	0.4 (1.0)	5.2 (13)	28 (71)
Source 1: Weather Channel
Source 2: WeatherDB

== Demographics ==
Historical population
Census	Pop.	Note	%±
1800	3,047		—
1810	3,533		16.0%
1820	3,790		7.3%
1830	3,801		0.3%
1840	3,921		3.2%
1850	5,036		28.4%
1860	6,522		29.5%
1870	7,644		17.2%
1880	7,892		3.2%
1890	10,131		28.4%
1900	12,172		20.1%
1910	16,463		35.3%
1920	22,123		34.4%
1930	33,112		49.7%
1940	35,509		7.2%
1950	40,835		15.0%
1960	53,793		31.7%
1970	59,755		11.1%
1980	59,578		−0.3%
1990	58,441		−1.9%
2000	61,101		4.6%
2010	61,171		0.1%
2020	63,518		3.8%

At the 2020 U.S. census, there were 63,518 people in Greenwich. Per the American Community Survey's 2018 estimates, the population of Greenwich grew to 62,574. There were 24,234 housing units, 22,251 households, and 16,322 families in 2018. The town's racial and ethnic makeup was 72.8% non-Hispanic White, 3.3% Black or African American, 0.1% American Indian or Alaska Native, 7.6% Asian, and 2.2% of more than one race. Hispanic or Latino residents made up 13.8% of the population.

The average household size from 2014 to 2018 grew to 2.78 members and the average family size was 3.28. The median household income excluding capital gains was $142,819 and the average income was $272,636. Including capital gains, the median household income in 2014 was $511,411. The per capita income for the town was $98,467.

At the census of 2000, there were 61,101 people, 23,230 households, and 16,237 families residing in the town. The population density was 1,277.6 inhabitants per square mile (493.3/km^{2}). There were 24,511 housing units at an average density of 512.5 per square mile (197.9/km^{2}). At the census estimates of 2013, the racial makeup of the town was 80.90% White, 4.90% Black, 0.10% Native American, 7.80% Asian, 0.03% Pacific Islander, and 2.50% from two or more races. Hispanic or Latino residents of any race were 13.90% of the population.

There were 23,230 households, out of which 33.5% had children under the age of 18 living with them, 59.4% were married couples living together, 8.0% had a female householder with no husband present, and 30.1% were non-families. 24.8% of all households were made up of individuals, and 9.9% had someone living alone who was 65 years of age or older. The average household size was 2.60 members and the average family size was 3.12.

In the town, the age distribution of the population was as follows: 25.4% under the age of 18, 4.1% from 18 to 24, 28.8% from 25 to 44, 25.7% from 45 to 64, and 15.9% who were 65 years of age or older. The median age was 40 years. For every 100 females, there were 90.1 males. For every 100 females age 18 and over, there were 85.2 males.

=== Wealth ===
Greenwich is home to three of the wealthiest zip codes in Connecticut, 06878, 06830 and 06831, with average adjusted gross incomes of $754,990, $638,560 and $721,550, and median household incomes of $182,386, $109,250 and $155,417, respectively. In recent decades, the town has attracted wealthy expatriates due to its low tax rate, school system, and proximity to Manhattan. The median listing price for a home in the town was $2.3 million in 2021.

=== Asian population growth ===
From 2010 to 2020 the town’s Asian-American population increased by 18%. Tatiana Flowers of Greenwich Time stated that reasons for Asian Americans to move to Greenwich included its closeness to New York City, the public education system, and the availability of public transportation.

== Economy ==
Greenwich, along with Stamford, is an economic hub of Fairfield County and its metropolitan statistical area. Prominent companies based in the town of Greenwich include AQR Capital, Blue Harbour Group, Blyth, Inc., Cambridge Solutions, First Reserve Corporation, Interactive Brokers, Nestlé Waters North America, North Street Capital, Silver Point Capital, Viking Global Investors, W. R. Berkley, a holding company for subsidiaries that sell property-casualty insurance, XFL, and XPO, Inc. Other major institutions in the township are Greenwich Hospital, Hyatt Regency, Tudor Investment Corporation, Eversource Energy, Brunswick School, and Camuto Group. Former companies based in Greenwich include Blue Sky Studios.

== Arts and culture ==
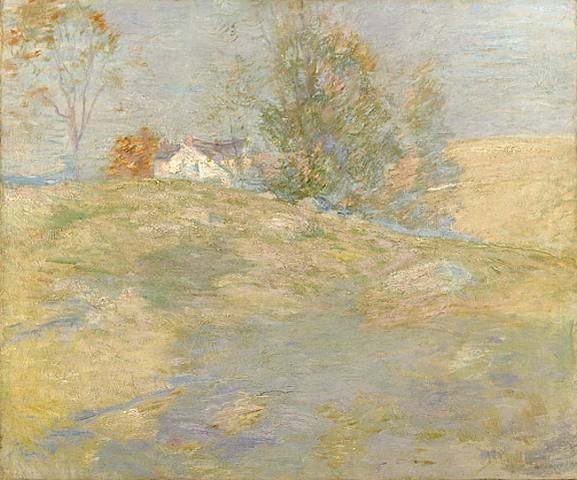
Artist's Home in Autumn, Greenwich, Connecticut (c. 1895), by John Henry Twachtman

Greenwich was home to the Greenwich International Film Festival, which acts in coordination with nonprofits to promote socially conscious filmmaking in the city's downtown in an annual June festival, in addition to screenings and events held year-round. The festival announced it was closing in June 2025.

The Greenwich Symphony Orchestra begun in 1958 as the Greenwich Philharmonia. The Philharmonia was conducted by high school music teacher Ken Wendrich. The orchestra became fully professional by 1967. That year the orchestra found a new conductor, Juilliard graduate John Nelson. The Greenwich Choral Society, founded in 1925, performs locally and elsewhere, including in New York City and Europe.

The Greenwich post office contains a mural, The Packet Sails from Greenwich Green, painted in 1939 by Victoria Hutson Huntley.

The Bruce Museum is a town-owned institution with sections devoted to art and natural history. Putnam Cottage (Knapp Tavern) historic house museum, is also located within Greenwich.

Acacia Lodge No. 85, Ancient, Free & Accepted Masons, founded in 1857 in the top level of the old Cos Cob School House, is located in the town. Its members were originally of Union Lodge No. 5, founded 1763, and though its "home base" was Stamford, it was given the jurisdiction of "Stamford, Horseneck and parts adjacent." Union Lodge often met in Greenwich, and the first recorded meeting place was Knapp's Tavern on the King's Highway.

The Greenwich Town Party is a recurring music festival in Greenwich. Past headliners have included The Temptations, Paul Simon, the Eagles, Santana, the Doobie Brothers, Billy Joel, Steely Dan and Mumford & Sons.

== Sports and recreation ==
=== Recreation ===
The Greenwich Y.M.C.A., which appears on the National Register of Historic Places, offers fitness and social services.

Equinox, a luxury fitness club, has a location in Greenwich.

Arch Street, The Greenwich Teen Center has age-specific programs and events on weekdays and weekends.

Dorothy Hamill Rink is a town-owned ice rink open seasonally.

The Greenwich Polo Club is a polo club and event venue that was established in 1981.

=== Beaches ===
The town has four beaches on Long Island Sound:

- Greenwich Point
- Byram Beach
- Island Beach (Little Captain's Island)
- Great Captain Island

=== Parks ===
- Binney Park
- Pomerance Park
- Bruce Park
- Cos Cob Park
- Byram Park
- Babcock Preserve
- Mianus River Park
- Greenwich Common

=== Private membership clubs ===
- Greenwich Country Club
- The Milbrook Club
- Round Hill Club
- The Stanwich Club
- Burning Tree Country Club
- Field Club of Greenwich
- Tamarack Country Club
- Fairview Country Club
- Indian Harbor Yacht Club
- Riverside Yacht Club
- Belle Haven Club
- Old Greenwich Yacht Club (OGYC)
- Rocky Point Club
- Greenwich Water Club
- Greenwich Boat & Yacht Club
- Innis Arden Golf Club
- The Greenwich Skating Club

== Education ==
=== Public schools ===
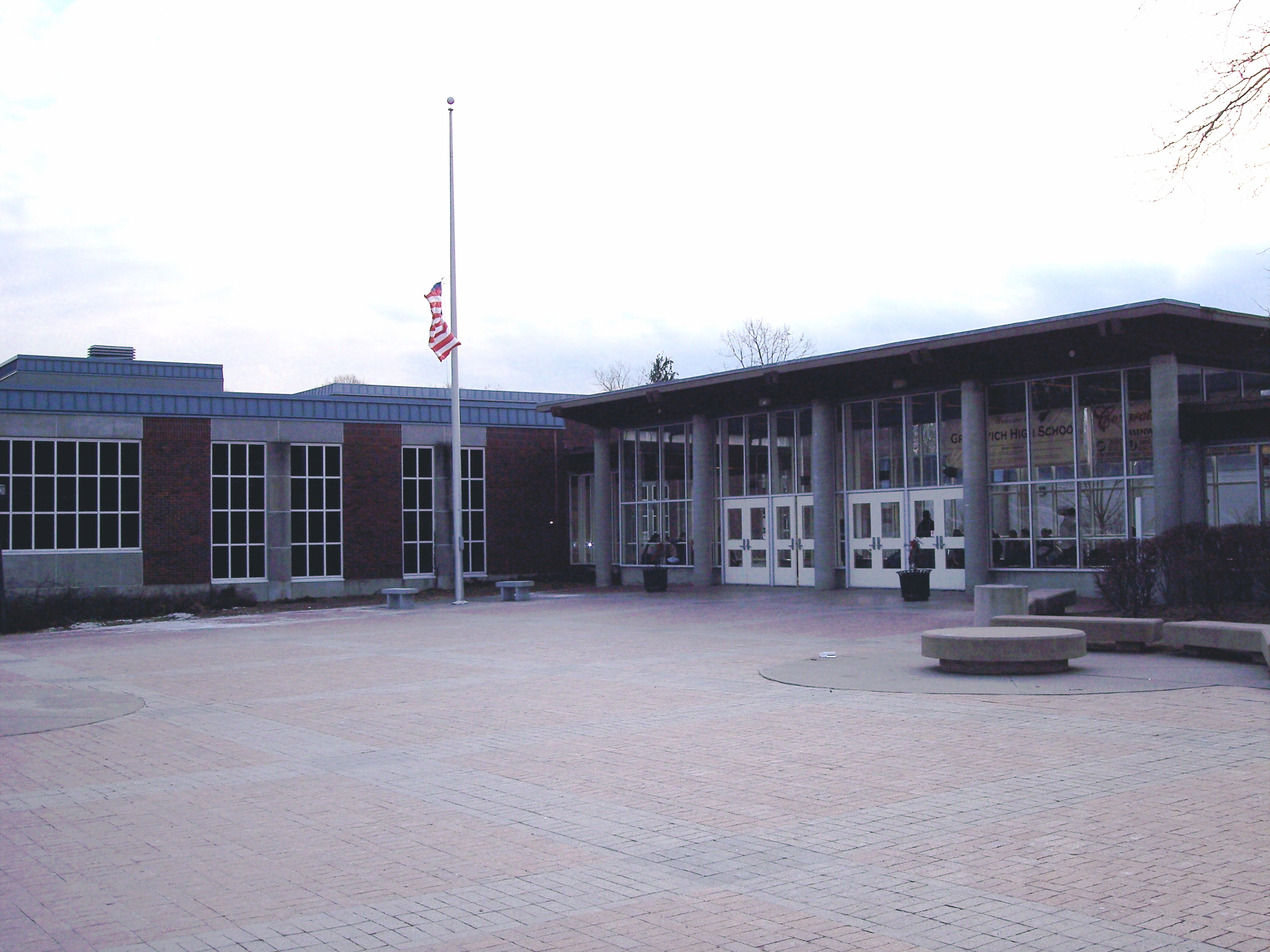
Greenwich High School

Greenwich High School is the district's sole high school. As of 2012, elementary schools had the same racial demographics as the town. The 3 middle schools have representative enrollment.

Elementary Schools:

- Cos Cob School
- Glenville School
- Hamilton Avenue School
- International School at Dundee
- Julian Curtiss School
- New Lebanon School
- North Mianus School
- North Street School
- Old Greenwich School
- Parkway School
- Riverside School

Middle Schools:

- Central Middle School
- Eastern Middle School
- Western Middle School

High Schools:

- Greenwich High School

=== Private schools ===
Approximately 25-30% of K-12 residents are enrolled in private schools, a high ratio compared to other municipalities in Connecticut and elsewhere in the region.

- Brunswick School, a non-sectarian boys' school (the brother school to Greenwich Academy) (Pre-K–12)
- Greenwich Academy, a non-sectarian girls' school (the sister school to Brunswick) (Pre-K–12)
- Eagle Hill School (K–10)
- Convent of the Sacred Heart, a girls' school with Catholic affiliation (Pre-K–12)
- Greenwich Catholic School (Pre-K–8), 471 North Street (of the Roman Catholic Diocese of Bridgeport)
- Greenwich Country Day School (originally nursery–9) (Acquired Stanwich School for 10–12, 2017)
- Greenwich Japanese School (Japanese School of New York), a New York City area Nihonjin gakko, a Japanese expatriate school (K–9), which moved to Greenwich in 1992; previously it was in New York City.
- Escuela Argentina en Greenwich (K–8), the only Spanish language international school in the New York metro.
- Whitby School (18 months through grade 8), a Montessori and International Baccalaureate World School (IB).

==== Former private schools ====
- Carmel Academy (K–8), a Jewish school sharing a campus with Greenwich Japanese School. In 2010, the school changed its name from Westchester Fairfield Hebrew Academy. Closed in 2020.
- Daycroft School, closed 1991
- The Stanwich School (Pre-K–12), merged with Greenwich Country Day School in 2017
- Rosemary Hall, merged into the Choate Rosemary Hall, the campus was previously occupied by a host of different schools but is now owned by Brunswick

== Government and politics ==
The town of Greenwich is one political and taxing body, but consists of several distinct sections or neighborhoods, such as Banksville, Byram, Cos Cob, Glenville, Mianus, Old Greenwich, Riverside and Greenwich (sometimes referred to as central, or downtown, Greenwich). Of these neighborhoods, three (Cos Cob, Old Greenwich, and Riverside) have separate postal names and ZIP codes.

The town has three selectmen and a Representative Town Meeting (RTM). The RTM must approve all budgets, and consists of 230 elected representatives. RTM members are not paid. The three selectmen are elected on a town-wide basis, although each person can only vote for two members. This assures that there will almost always be one Democrat and two Republicans or two Democrats and one Republican. While voter registration is skewed in the Republicans' favor, they do not have a lock on the First Selectman's chair, and Democrats have held the seat recently. Many of the other town committees have equal representation between Democrats and Republicans, regardless of the vote breakdown, since each individual can only vote for half as many seats as are available.

Greenwich town vote by party in presidential elections
Year	Democratic	Republican	Third Parties
2024	57.34% 19,603	41.31% 14,122	1.35% 464
2020	61.59% 22,243	36.74% 13,269	1.67% 600
2016	56.49% 17,630	39.14% 12,215	4.37% 1,364
2012	43.90% 13,079	55.24% 16,456	0.86% 255
2008	53.44% 16,233	45.89% 13,937	0.67% 204
2004	47.00% 14,334	51.90% 15,830	1.10% 336
2000	44.16% 12,780	51.51% 14,905	4.33% 1,253
1996	41.49% 11,622	51.08% 14,308	7.43% 2,080
1992	36.62% 11,893	48.91% 15,885	14.47% 4,698
1988	33.25% 10,205	65.68% 20,158	1.07% 327
1984	29.08% 9,620	70.63% 23,361	0.29% 95
1980	27.25% 8,670	60.90% 19,379	11.85% 3,770
1976	33.21% 10,400	66.19% 20,725	0.60% 187
1972	29.90% 9,289	69.02% 21,440	1.08% 335
1968	35.46% 10,396	61.29% 17,972	3.25% 953
1964	54.88% 15,265	45.12% 12,549	0.00% 0
1960	34.43% 9,554	65.57% 18,199	0.00% 0
1956	21.75% 5,566	78.25% 20,026	0.00% 0
1952	28.89% 6,809	70.88% 16,708	0.23% 54
1948	29.51% 5,485	68.31% 12,697	2.18% 405
1944	35.50% 6,157	64.50% 11,188	0.00% 0
1940	33.20% 5,625	66.80% 11,319	0.00% 0
1936	40.46% 5,452	59.54% 8,024	0.00% 0
1932	38.42% 4,252	61.58% 6,816	0.00% 0
1928	34.24% 3,363	65.29% 6,413	0.47% 46
1924	19.54% 1,112	74.53% 4,242	5.94% 338
1920	22.44% 1,096	75.12% 3,669	2.44% 119
1916	37.70% 1,130	60.56% 1,815	1.74% 52
1912	37.23% 956	35.16% 903	27.61% 709
1908	34.95% 881	61.92% 1,561	3.13% 79
1904	39.22% 937	58.35% 1,394	2.43% 58
1900	39.91% 902	59.82% 1,352	0.27% 6
1896	34.21% 740	63.48% 1,373	2.31% 50
1892	52.84% 1,051	46.10% 917	1.06% 21
1888	51.85% 938	46.77% 846	1.38% 25
1884	50.95% 828	47.82% 777	1.23% 20
1880	50.44% 808	49.56% 794	0.00% 0
1876	52.51% 774	47.49% 700	0.00% 0
1872	47.52% 469	52.48% 518	0.00% 0
1868	52.84% 578	46.10% 451	0.00% 0
1864	55.71% 576	43.30% 458	0.00% 0
1860	49.1% 465	49.9% 473	1.00% 10
1856	42.79% 377	43.70% 385	13.51% 119
1852	52.92% 371	44.22% 310	2.85% 20
1848	39.07% 234	52.75% 316	8.18% 49
1844	51.01% 355	47.13% 328	1.87% 13
1840	52.17% 337	47.83% 309	0.00% 0
1836	64.56% 102	35.44% 56	0.00% 0
1832	58.04% 166	25.52% 73	16.43% 47
1828	21.93% 25	78.07% 89	0.00% 0

=== United States Congress ===
Senators	Name	Party	Assumed office	Level
Senate Class 1	Richard Blumenthal	Democratic	2011	Senior Senator
Senate Class 3	Chris Murphy	Democratic	2013	Junior Senator
Representatives	Name	Party	Assumed office	
District 4	Jim Himes	Democratic	2009	

=== Connecticut General Assembly ===
==== Connecticut State Senate ====
District	Name	Party	Assumed office
36	Ryan Fazio	Republican	2021

==== Connecticut House of Representatives ====
District	Name	Party	Assumed office
149	Rachel Khanna	Democratic	2023
150	Steve Meskers	Democratic	2019
151	Hector Arzeno	Democratic	2023

=== Voter registration ===
Voter registration and party enrollment as of July 18, 2024
Party	Active voters	Percentage
Unaffiliated	16,138	39.3%
Democratic	11,740	29.8%
Republican	11,498	29.3%
Minor parties	651	1.7%
Total	39,376	100.0%

== Infrastructure ==
=== Transportation ===
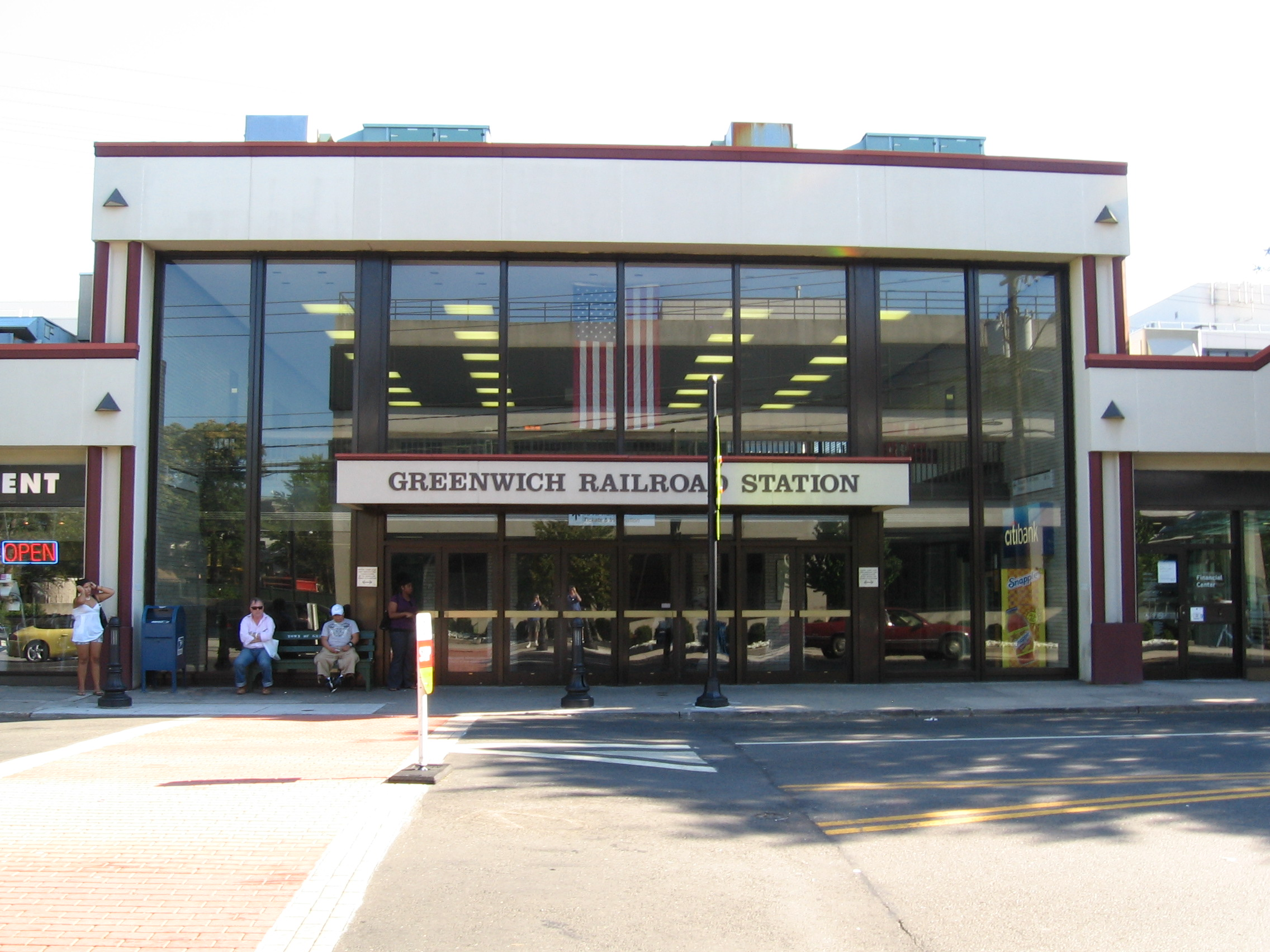
Greenwich Metro-North station

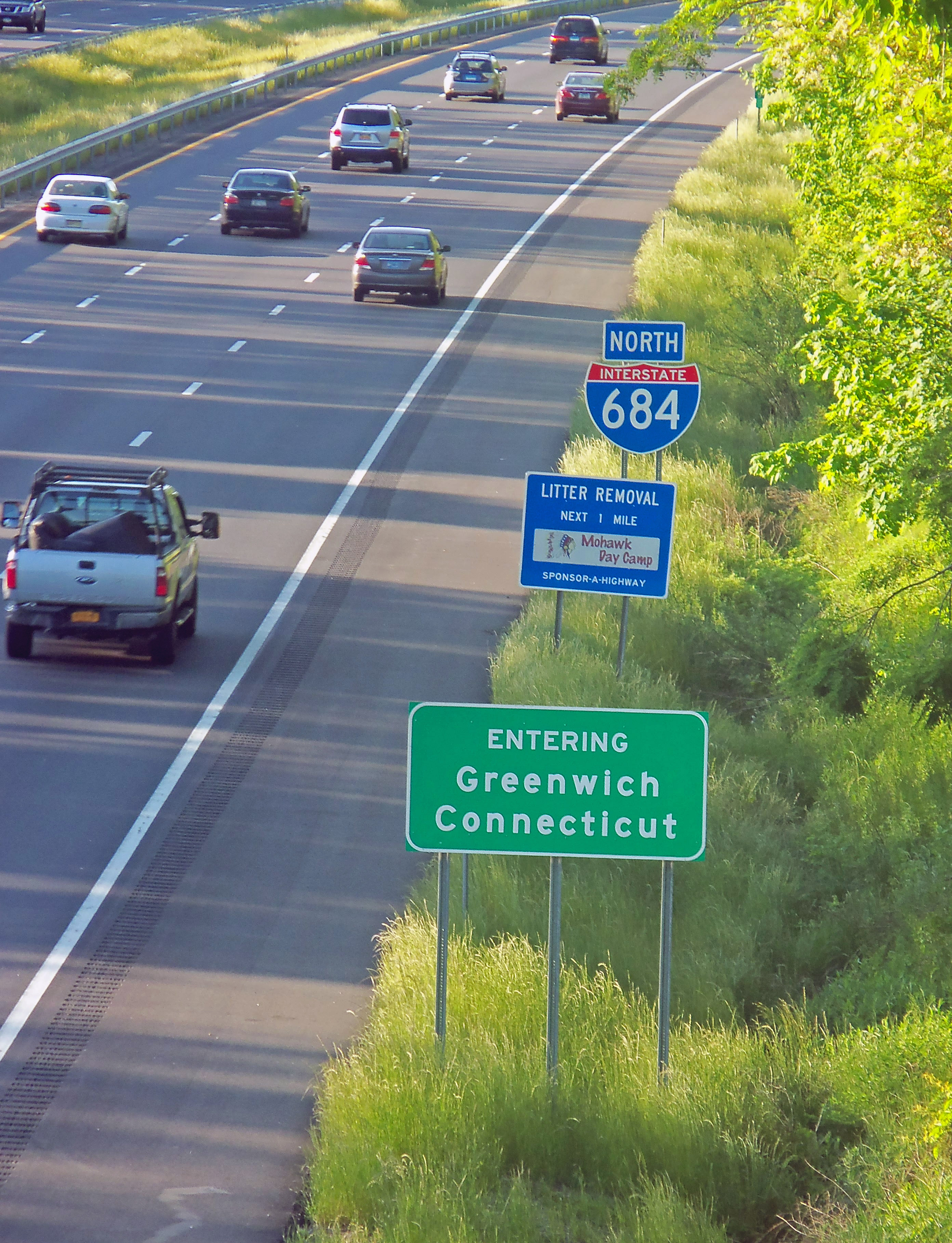
I-684 in Greenwich

The town is served by the Metro-North Railroad's New Haven Line (the four stations, from west to east, are Greenwich, Cos Cob, Riverside, and Old Greenwich) and is approximately a 50-minute train ride to Grand Central Terminal in Manhattan on the express train and a 60-minute ride on the local. The Amtrak Acela, Northeast Regional, and Vermonter trains stop in the adjacent city of Stamford.

Interstate 95 goes through the southern end of town, and there are four exits from I-95 in Greenwich, exits 2 through 5. The Boston Post Road (also known as East or West Putnam Avenue or simply Route 1) also goes through town, as does the Merritt Parkway, although the Merritt Parkway is a considerable distance from the downtown area. Interstate 684 passes through Greenwich, but cannot be entered or exited there, and the nearest interchange is at the Westchester County Airport in New York State.

Westchester County Airport is the closest commercial airport to Greenwich. It takes approximately 15 minutes to drive from the town's center. This is followed by LaGuardia Airport in Queens, New York, approximately a 35-minute drive. John F. Kennedy International Airport in Queens, New York, is the closest international airport, approximately a one-hour drive. Newark Liberty International Airport in New Jersey is also easily accessible from Greenwich, taking approximately one hour to drive to.

According to the DataHaven Community Wellbeing Survey, a statewide program funded by various agencies and philanthropies, 4% of adults in Greenwich are "transportation insecure," meaning that they have had to stay at home during the past year due to a lack of adequate transportation. The comparable rate for all adults statewide is 13%.

=== Fire department ===
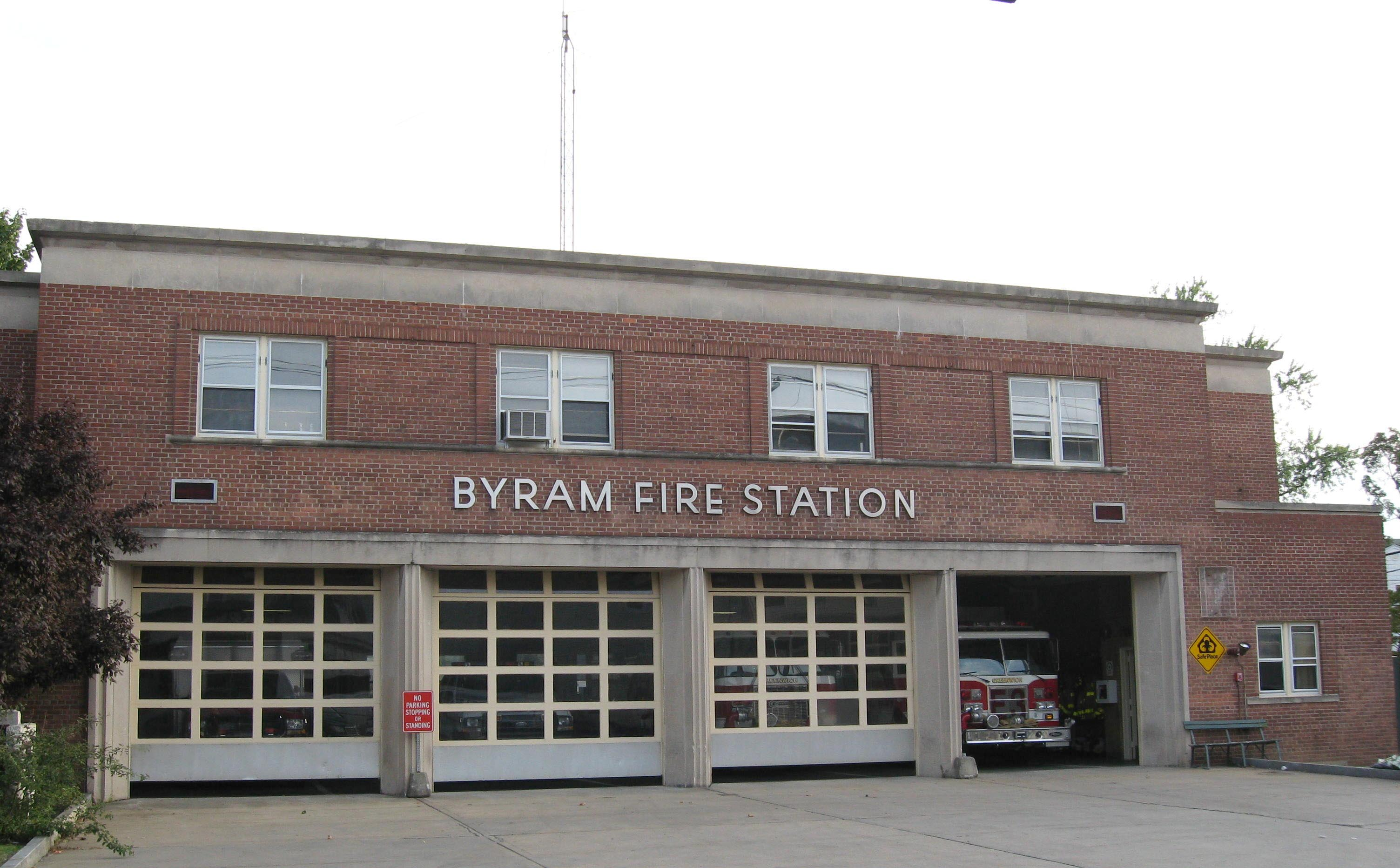
The Byram Fire Station, located on Delavan Avenue

The town of Greenwich is protected by the paid career members of the Greenwich Fire Department (GFD) and eight all-volunteer fire companies, in addition to a Fire Police Patrol. There is also the Cos Cob Fire Police Patrol, one of the only remaining Fire Police Patrols in Fairfield County, Connecticut.

=== Police department ===
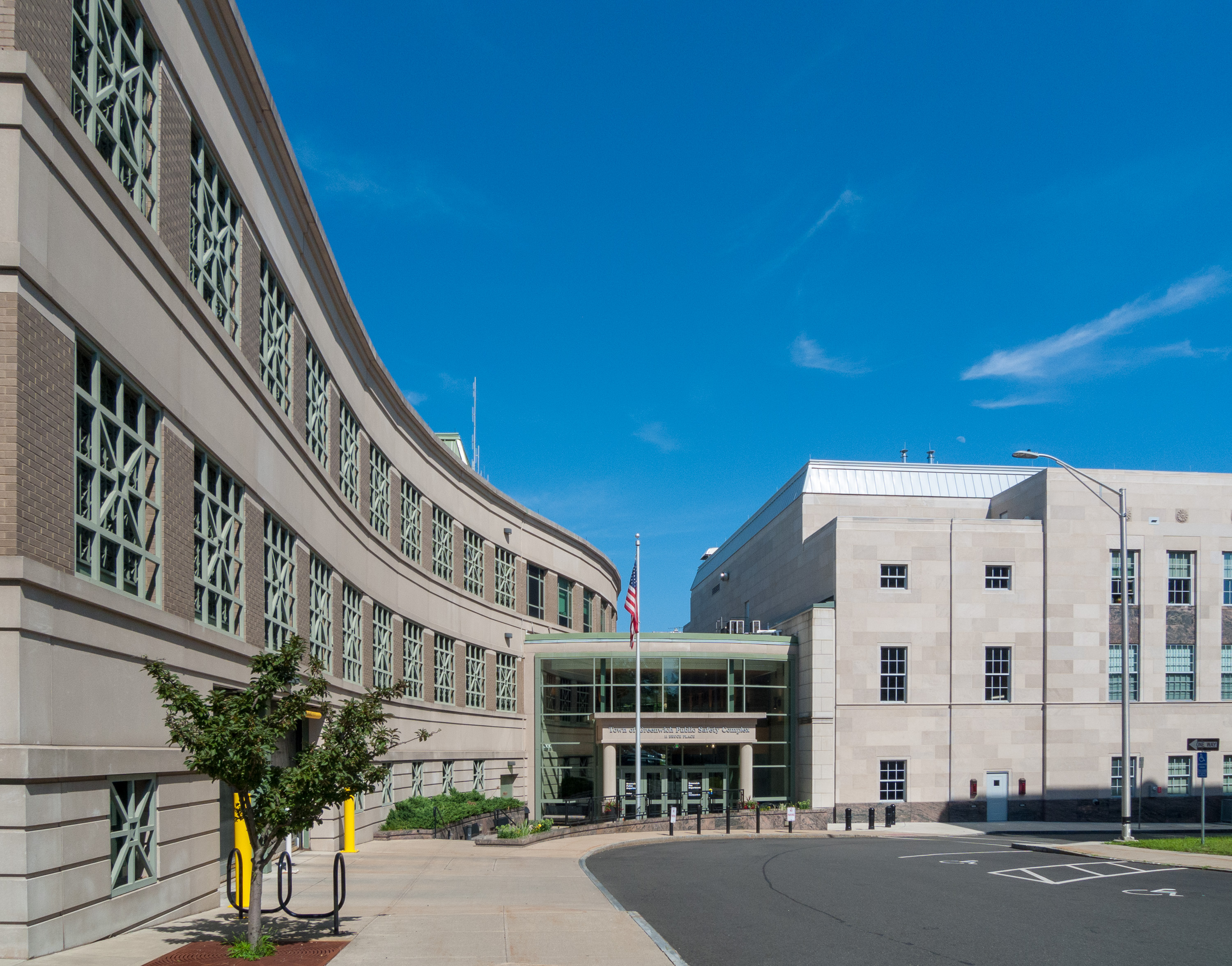
Public Safety Complex on Bruce Place

Located at 11 Bruce Place, Greenwich Police Department (GPD) includes a K-9 unit.

=== Libraries ===
- Byram Shubert Library
- Cos Cob Library
- Greenwich Library
- Perrot Library

== Media ==
=== Newspapers and print ===
- Greenwich Magazine, owned by Moffly Publications, which publishes other local magazines.
- Greenwich Sentinel, local weekly printed newspaper.
- Greenwich Time, a daily newspaper based in Greenwich; published by Hearst Corporation, which also owns The Advocate of Stamford. Some sections are identical to the same sections in The Advocate, including the arts and business sections.
- Living Greenwich, a digital publication.

== Sister cities ==
City	Region	Country	Year
Kitzbühel	Tyrol	Austria	1961
Vienne	Isère	France	
Nacka	Stockholm	Sweden	
Morra De Sanctis	Campania	Italy	2013
Rose, Calabria	Calabria	Italy	2013
Hangzhou	Zhejiang	China	2017
Izium	Kharkiv	Ukraine	2023

== See also ==
- National Register of Historic Places listings in Greenwich, Connecticut
- History of Greenwich, Connecticut
