= Greenwich (CDP), Connecticut =

Greenwich, Connecticut
- Census-designated place
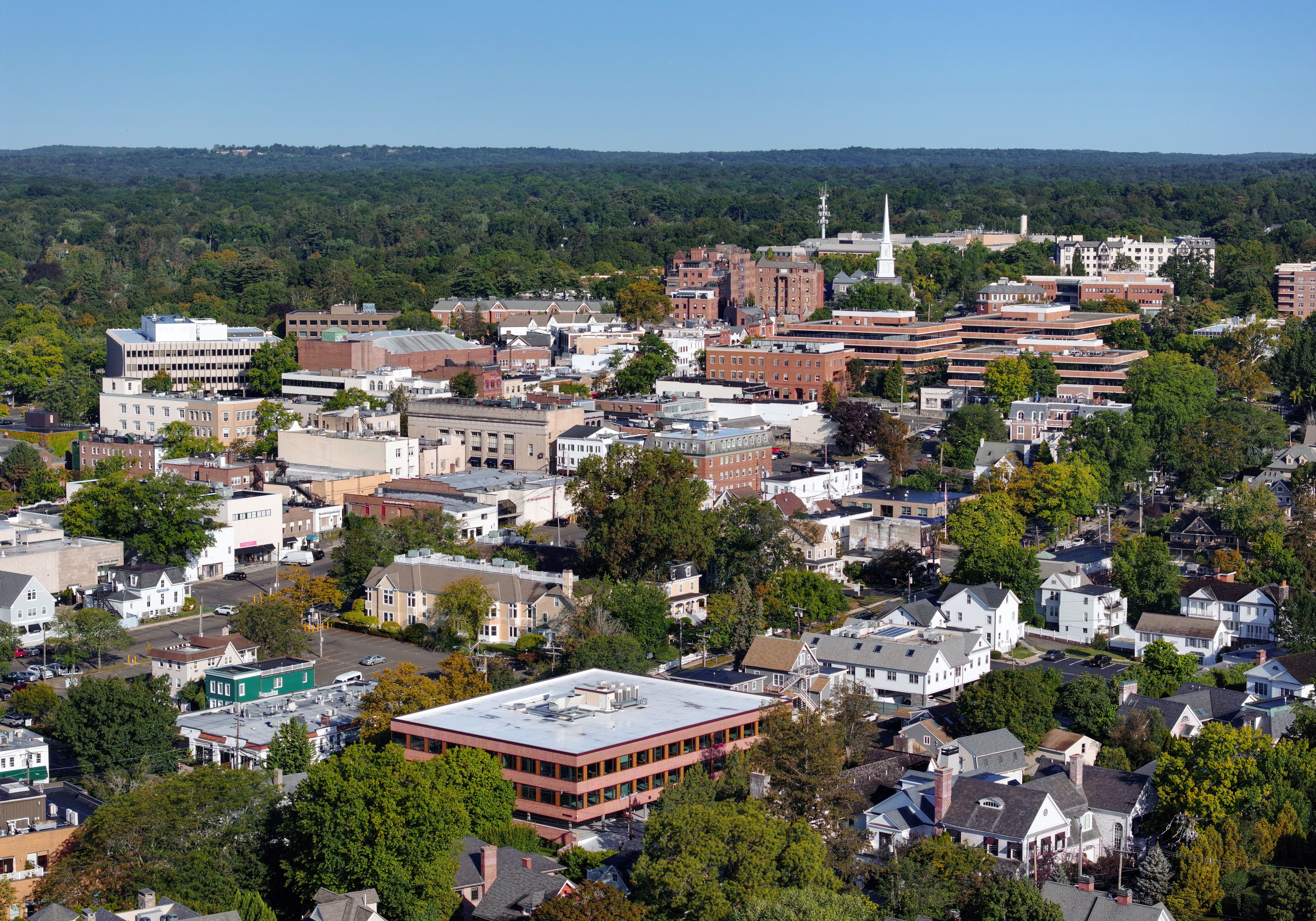
- Greenwich skyline

- Location in Fairfield County and the state of Connecticut.
- Coordinates: 41°1′40″N 73°37′45″W
- State: Connecticut
- County: Fairfield
- Town: Greenwich

Area
  - Total: 4.43 sq mi (11.48 km^{2})
  - Land: 4.11 sq mi (10.65 km^{2})
  - Water: 0.32 sq mi (0.83 km^{2})
- Elevation: 118 ft (36 m)

Population (2010)
  - Total: 12,942
  - Density: 3,148/sq mi (1,215.3/km^{2})
- ZIP Codes: 06830, 06831
- FIPS code: 09-33690
- GNIS feature ID: 2631566

Greenwich is a census-designated place (CDP) in Fairfield County, Connecticut, United States. It is one of several CDPs within the town of Greenwich and corresponds to the historic municipal center of the town and surrounding residential and commercial areas. As of the 2010 census, the population of the Greenwich CDP was 12,942, out of 61,171 in the entire town.

== Geography ==
The CDP is in the south-central part of the town of Greenwich, bordered to the south by Long Island Sound from Byram Harbor on the west to Indian Harbor on the east. The CDP includes Greenwich Harbor, as well as the Greenwich Avenue Historic District and the related Greenwich Municipal Center Historic District. To the north the CDP extends as far as North Maple Avenue, Ridgebrook Road, Andrews Road, and the junction of North Street with Fairfield Road. The CDP is bordered to the west by the Greenwich neighborhoods of Pemberwick and Byram, and the neighborhood of Cos Cob is a short distance to the east.

U.S. Route 1 (Putnam Avenue) passes through the center of the community, leading northeast 5 miles (8 km) to Stamford and southwest 2.5 miles (4.0 km) to Port Chester, New York. Interstate 95 crosses the CDP to the south of US 1, with access from Exit 3 (Arch Street). The Greenwich Metro-North station is in the center of the community, just north of I-95.

According to the U.S. Census Bureau, the Greenwich CDP has an area of 4.4 square miles (11.5 km^{2}), of which 4.1 square miles (10.6 km^{2}) are land and 0.3 square miles (0.8 km^{2}), or 7.23%, are water.

== Demographics ==
As of the census of 2010, there were 12,942 people, 5,779 households, and 3,247 families residing in the CDP. The population density was 3,148 inhabitants per square mile (1,215 inhabitants/km^{2}). There were 6,548 housing units, of which 769, or 11.7%, were vacant. The racial makeup of the CDP was 80.9% White, 4.9% African American, 0.1% Native American or Alaska Native, 7.8% Asian, 0.05% Native Hawaiian or Pacific Islander, 3.7% some other race, and 2.5% from two or more races. Hispanic or Latino of any race were 13.9% of the population.

Of the 5,779 households in the community, 26.9% had children under the age of 18 living with them, 41.9% were headed by married couples living together, 11.6% had a female householder with no husband present, and 43.8% were non-families. 38.0% of all households were made up of individuals, and 15.6% were someone living alone who was 65 years of age or older. The average household size was 2.22, and the average family size was 2.98.

21.7% of the CDP population were under the age of 18, 5.2% were from 18 to 24, 26.3% were from 25 to 44, 29.1% were from 45 to 64, and 17.8% were 65 years of age or older. The median age was 42.9 years. For every 100 females, there were 85.1 males. For every 100 females age 18 and over, there were 80.6 males.

For the period 2013–17, the estimated median annual income for a household in the CDP was $94,309, and the median income for a family was $135,179. Per capita income was $89,941. Male full-time workers had a median income of $104,964 versus $63,380 for females. About 4.9% of families and 7.0% of the population were living below the poverty line, including 6.3% of those under age 18 and 10.5% of those age 65 and over.

== Education ==
As with other parts of the Town of Greenwich, Greenwich CDP is in the Greenwich Public Schools school district. The district's comprehensive high school is Greenwich High School.

A former campus of the Japanese School of New York (Greenwich Japanese School) is in the CDP.
