= Old Greenwich, Connecticut =

Census-designated place in Connecticut, United States

Coordinates: 41°01′22″N 73°33′53″W

- Census-designated place
- Village of Old Greenwich
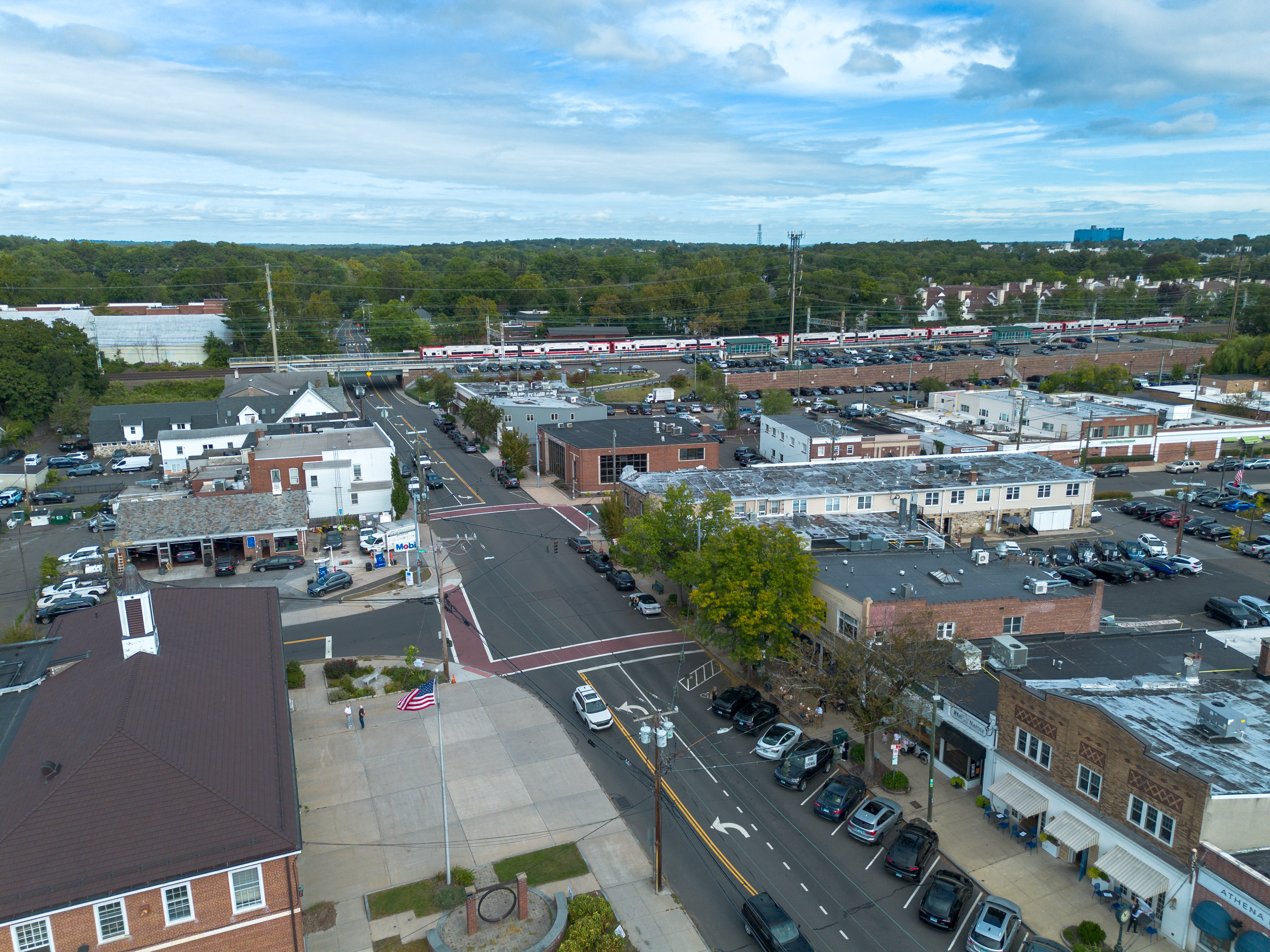
- Old Greenwich in 2025

- Country: United States
- U.S. state: Connecticut
- County: Fairfield
- Region: Western CT
- Town: Greenwich
- Established: 1641

Area
  - Total: 3.48 sq mi (9.01 km^{2})
  - Land: 2.00 sq mi (5.17 km^{2})
  - Water: 1.48 sq mi (3.84 km^{2})

Population (2010)
  - Total: 6,611
  - Density: 3,310/sq mi (1,280/km^{2})
- Time zone: UTC-5:00 (Eastern)
  - Summer (DST): UTC-4:00 (Eastern)
- Area codes: 203/475
- FIPS code: 09-56900
- GNIS feature ID: 2631571

Old Greenwich is a coastal village in Fairfield County, Connecticut, United States. As of the 2020 census, Old Greenwich had a population of 6,962.

The town of Greenwich is one political and taxing body, but consists of several distinct sections or neighborhoods, such as Byram, Cos Cob, Glenville, Mianus, Old Greenwich, Riverside, and Greenwich (sometimes referred to as central, or downtown, Greenwich). Of these neighborhoods, three (Cos Cob, Old Greenwich, and Riverside) have separate postal names and ZIP codes.

== History ==
One of the founding settlers of Old Greenwich was Elizabeth Fones, niece and daughter-in-law of John Winthrop, founder and governor of the Massachusetts Bay Colony. What is now called Greenwich Point was known for much of its early history as "Elizabeth Neck" in recognition of Elizabeth (Fones) Feake Hallet and her 1640 purchase of the Point and much of the area now known as Old Greenwich.

The Old Greenwich Railroad Station, originally called the "Sound Beach Railroad Station", built in 1894 and added to the National Register of Historic Places in 1989, serves commuters in the neighborhood. The town's largest beach is on a long, thin peninsula at the southwest end of the neighborhood. The town's local beach is called Tod's Point after a former resident. The beach is now public property, which belongs to the town of Greenwich. Residents can purchase a seasonal beach pass. Non-residents can purchase a one-day pass for $7 per person and $35 per vehicle. During "off season", Innis Arden, a local golf club, is a popular sledding destination for kids in Old Greenwich and neighboring Stamford.

Old Greenwich was known as "Sound Beach" in the 19th century for its proximity to Long Island Sound, and the main road through the small downtown business section is Sound Beach Avenue.

Old Greenwich had an industrial presence in the 1950s and 1960s when Electrolux had a vacuum manufacturing facility on Forest Avenue, opposite "ECCman Center" (now Greenwich Civic Center). Condé Nast operated a printing facility in Old Greenwich from 1924 to 1964 that published many different magazines, including Vogue, Vanity Fair, and House & Garden.

The town of Greenwich has one political body (RTM – Representative Town Meeting). It has several distinct sections, each with its own mailing address and ZIP code, such as Byram, Cos Cob, Glenville, Mianus, and Riverside and Greenwich proper (downtown Greenwich). The original "well-to-do" population lived mainly in "the Back Country" (north of the Merritt Parkway) or in the exclusive Belle Haven area on the waterfront. The town was founded there in 1641.

== Demographics ==
=== 2020 census ===
As of the 2020 census, Old Greenwich had a population of 6,962. The median age was 40.9 years. 30.3% of residents were under the age of 18 and 14.0% of residents were 65 years of age or older. For every 100 females there were 95.8 males, and for every 100 females age 18 and over there were 91.6 males age 18 and over.

99.2% of residents lived in urban areas, while 0.8% lived in rural areas.

There were 2,285 households in Old Greenwich, of which 46.7% had children under the age of 18 living in them. Of all households, 70.9% were married-couple households, 8.5% were households with a male householder and no spouse or partner present, and 18.5% were households with a female householder and no spouse or partner present. About 14.9% of all households were made up of individuals and 8.6% had someone living alone who was 65 years of age or older.

There were 2,440 housing units, of which 6.4% were vacant. The homeowner vacancy rate was 0.5% and the rental vacancy rate was 9.4%.

Racial composition as of the 2020 census
Race	Number	Percent
White	5,534	79.5%
Black or African American	69	1.0%
American Indian and Alaska Native	11	0.2%
Asian	519	7.5%
Native Hawaiian and Other Pacific Islander	0	0.0%
Some other race	110	1.6%
Two or more races	719	10.3%
Hispanic or Latino (of any race)	484	7.0%

== Education ==
As with other parts of the Town of Greenwich, Old Greenwich is in the Greenwich Public Schools school district. The district's comprehensive high school is Greenwich High School.

== Notable people ==
- Edwin Binney
- Ruth Madoff, wife of Bernie Madoff
- Tim Mazzetti
- Mike Sandlock
- Anya Seton
- Jack Trout
- Edward Vick
- Constance Walton
- Victor Borge, actor and comedian

== Gallery ==
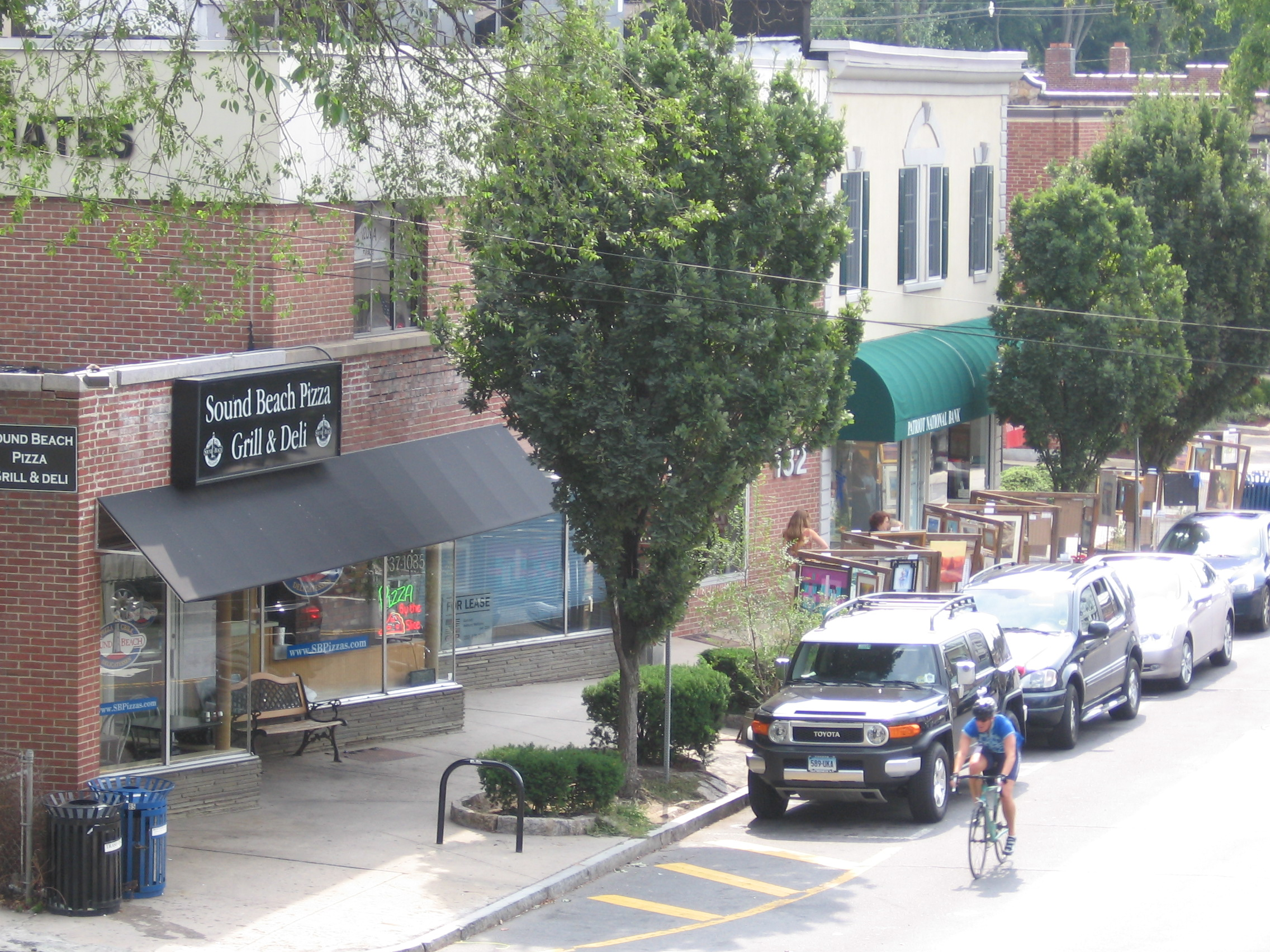
Sound Beach Avenue, east side

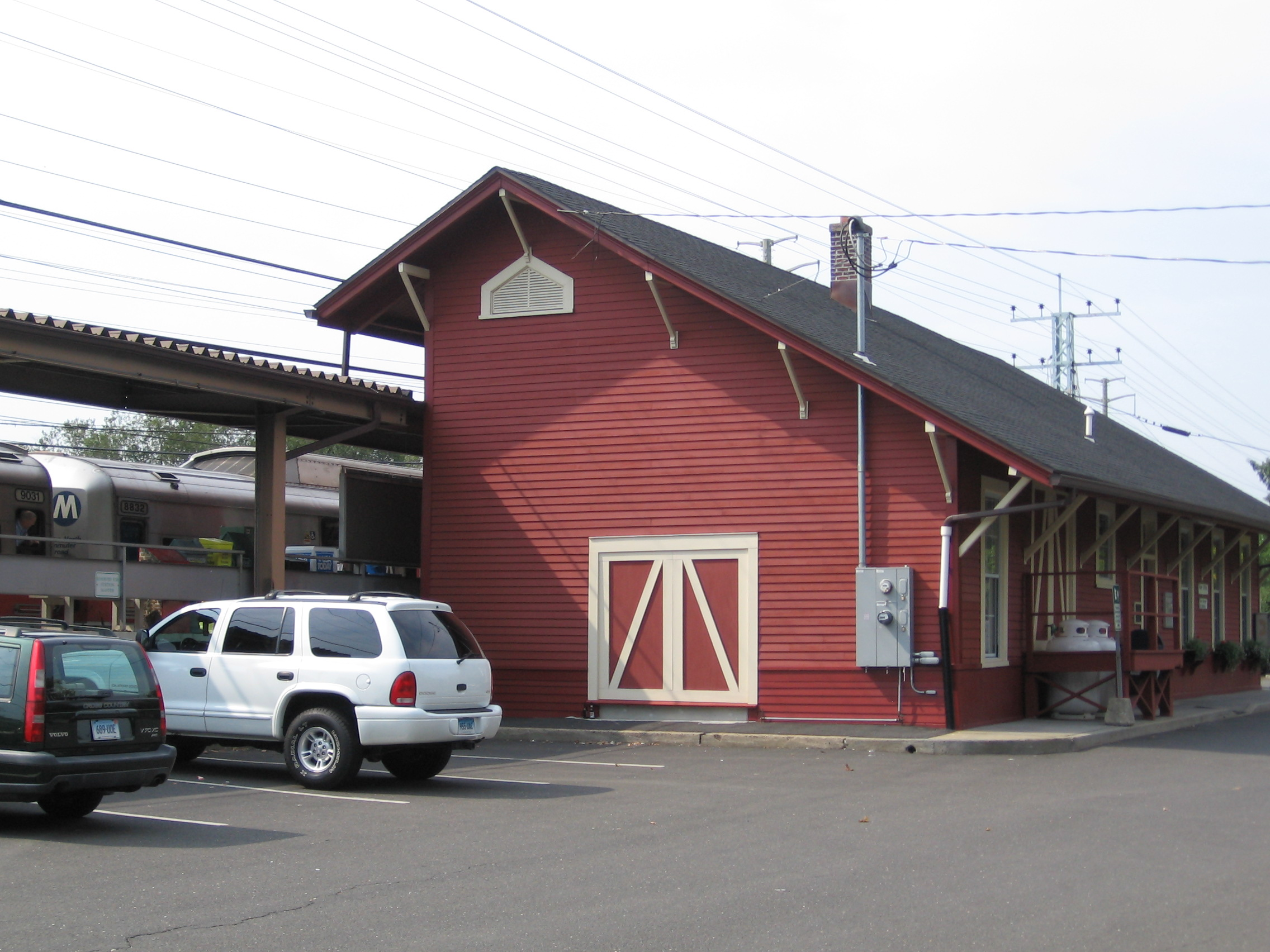
Old Greenwich Railroad Station

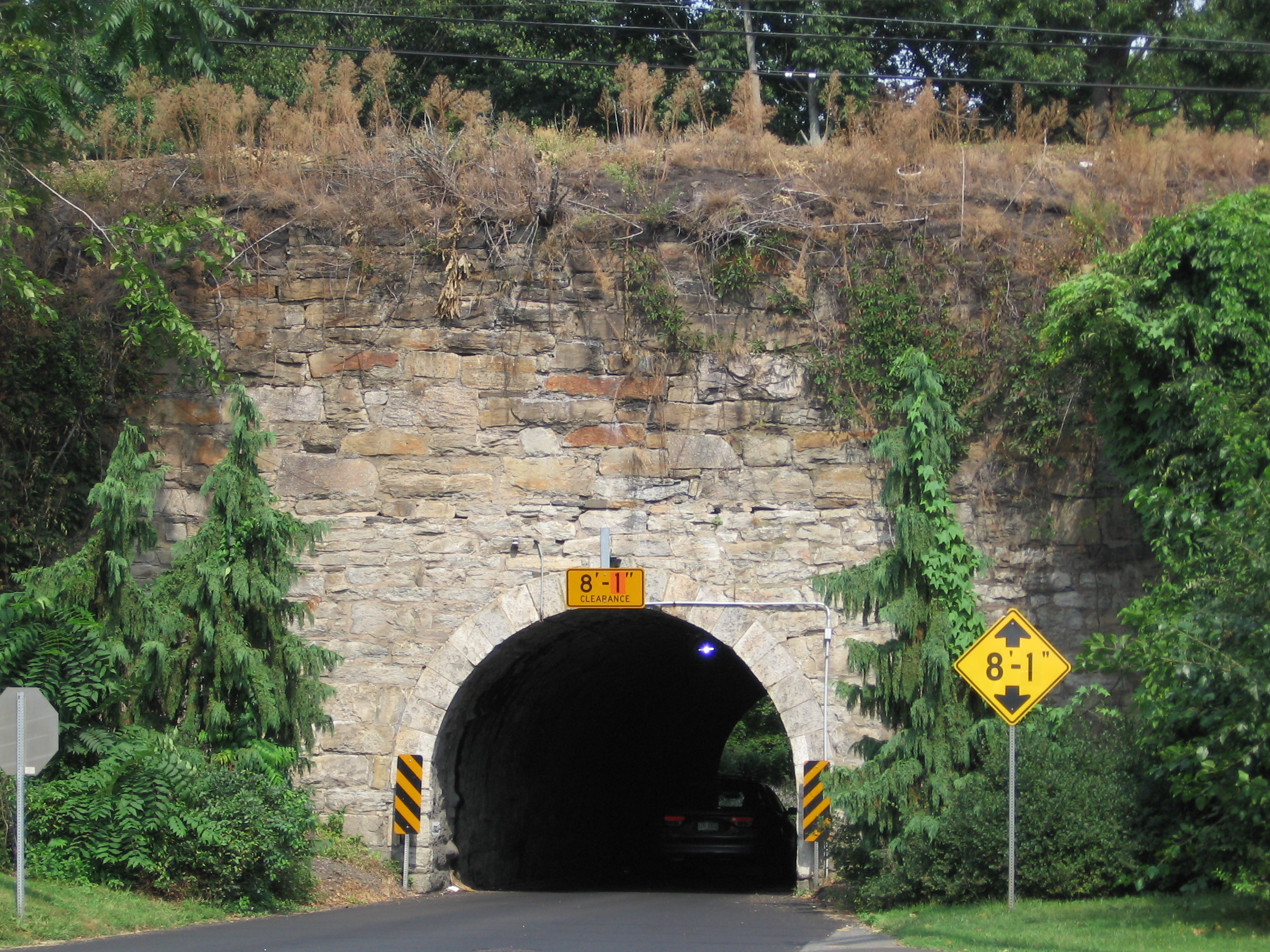
Arch Street tunnel under the railroad tracks

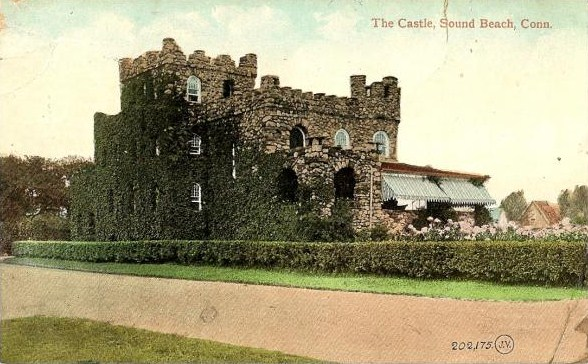
"The Castle," circa 1908

== See also ==
- List of highest-income urban areas in the United States
