= Cos Cob, Connecticut =

Census-designated place in Connecticut, United States

- Census-designated place
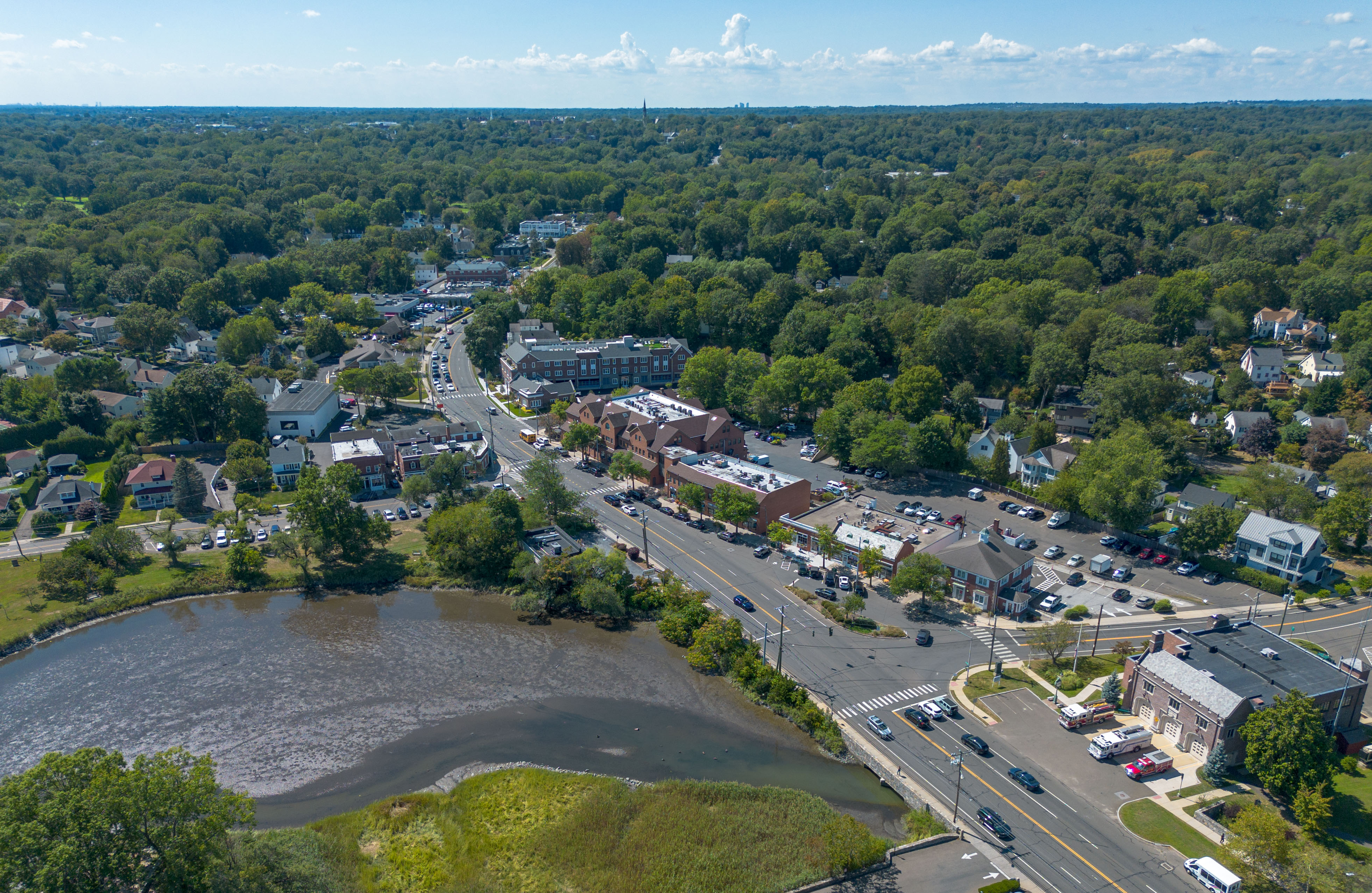
- Cos Cob in 2025

- Location in Fairfield County and the state of Connecticut.
- Coordinates: 41°02′00″N 73°35′58″W
- Country: United States
- U.S. state: Connecticut
- County: Fairfield
- NECTA: Bridgeport-Stamford-Norwalk
- Region: Western Connecticut
- Town: Greenwich

Area
  - Land: 2.15 sq mi (5.57 km^{2})

Population (2020)
  - Total: 6,873
  - Density: 3,193.8/sq mi (1,233.1/km^{2})
- Time zone: UTC−5 (Eastern (EST))
  - Summer (DST): UTC−4 (EDT)
- ZIP Code: 06807
- Area code: 203
- FIPS code: 17520

Cos Cob is a neighborhood and census-designated place in the town of Greenwich, Connecticut, United States. It is located on the Connecticut shoreline in southern Fairfield County. It had a population of 6,873 at the 2020 census.

Cos Cob is located on the western side of the mouth of the Mianus River. The American Impressionist Cos Cob Art Colony flourished in the late 19th and early 20th centuries. An offshoot of the group, the Greenwich Art Society, continues to support local artists in town.

The town of Greenwich is one political and taxing body, but consists of several distinct sections or neighborhoods, such as Banksville, Byram, Cos Cob, Glenville, Mianus, Old Greenwich, Riverside and Greenwich (sometimes referred to as central, or downtown, Greenwich). Of these neighborhoods, three (Cos Cob, Old Greenwich, and Riverside) have separate postal names and ZIP codes. From 1883 to 1885, the official post office name of Cos Cob was Bayport.

== History ==
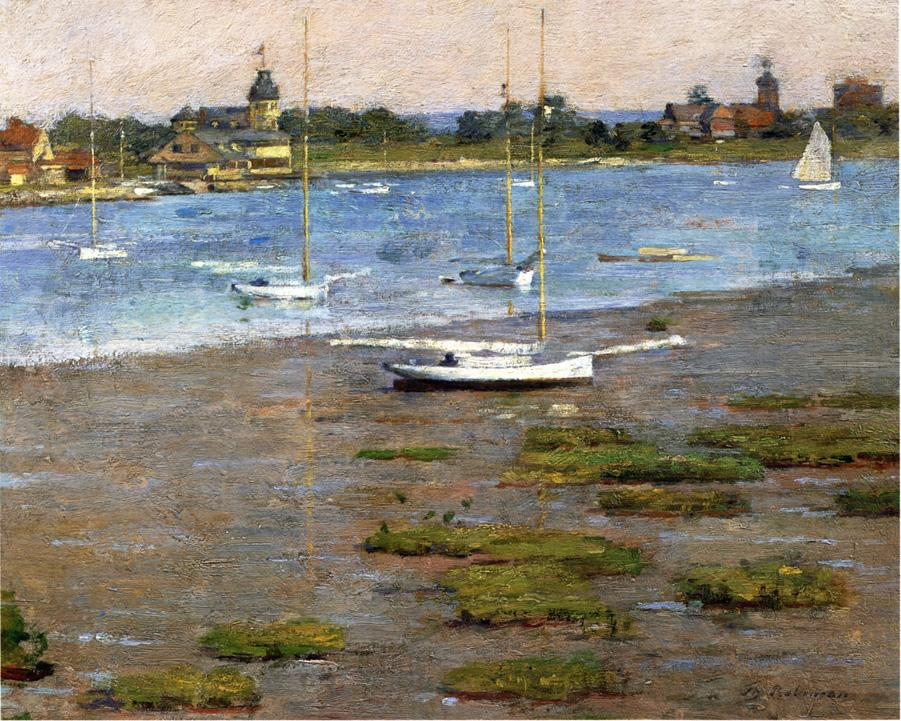
The Anchorage, Cos Cob by Theodore Robinson, c. 1894

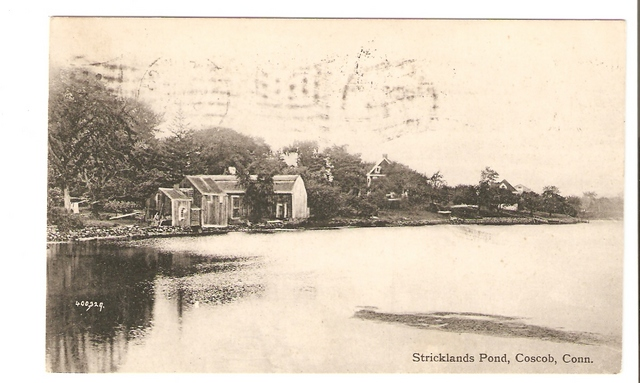
Stricklands Pond, c. 1911

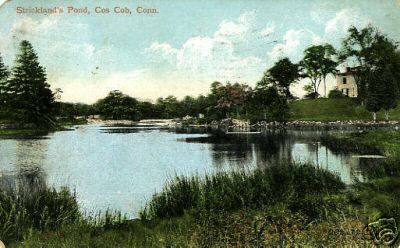
Strickland's Pond, c. 1910

The term "Cos Cob" comes from the Coe family that settled in the area in 1641. During their time, a wall, known as a "cob", was built on the shoreline by Robert Coe to protect the land he gave to his brother. Henceforth, the place was known as Coe's Cob, later becoming Cos Cob.

The community is situated on Cos Cob Harbor, a sheltered area on the north side of Long Island Sound. Cos Cob's role as a commercial shipping port, supplying potatoes and apples to New York City, disappeared with the appearance of the railroad and damming of the Mianus River. The river is now one source of the town's drinking water.

From 1883 to 1885, the official post office name of Cos Cob was Bayport.

=== Train station and bridge ===
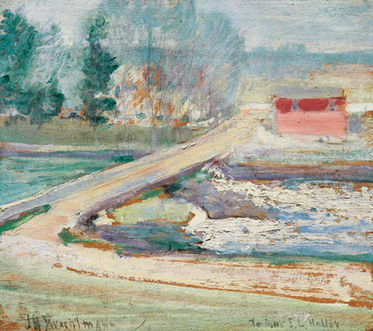
View from the Holley House, c. 1901 by John Henry Twachtman (1853–1902), private collection

The Cos Cob train station and the Mianus River Railroad Bridge are listed on the National Register of Historic Places. According to the Stamford Historical Society website:

On Christmas Day, 1848, the last rails were laid over the Cos Cob Bridge, thereby supplying the last link needed to complete the railroad from New Haven to New York. The first trial run was made on that day.

Editors of two Stamford newspapers reported on the event. William H. Holly, Esq., founder of the Stamford Sentinel and a guest on the first trial run, wrote: "The train had to remain at Cos Cob Bridge some three hours for the last rails to be laid over it and the delay gave ample opportunity to the people to come and witness the wonderful feat. The general impression among them seemed to be, that the first train that attempted to cross this pass would also be the last."

Edgar Hoyt, editor of the Stamford Advocate, wrote: "The citizens of the village as well as the horses, cattle, etc., were nearly frightened out of their propriety ... by such a horrible scream as was never heard to issue from any other than a metallic throat. Animals of every description went careening round the fields, snuffling the air in their terror."

=== 20th and 21st centuries ===
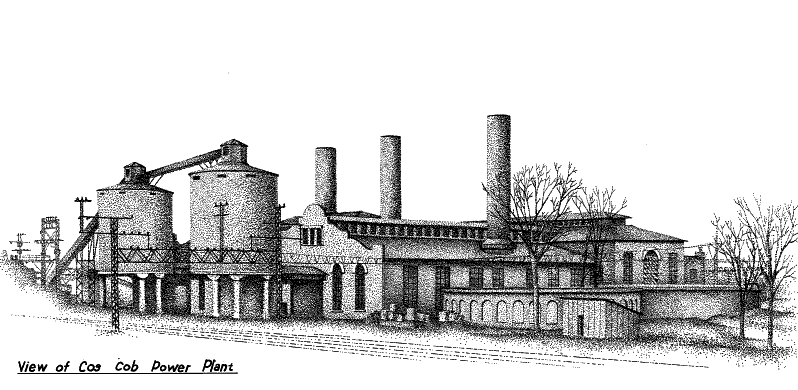
Cos Cob Power Plant on Long Island Sound

The coal-fired steam turbine Cos Cob Power Plant built by Westinghouse in 1907 was a Mission Style structure. It was designated a Historic Mechanical Engineering Landmark in 1982 by the ASME and the IEEE. Despite being listed on the National Register of Historic Places and local and national debate, the plant was decommissioned in 1987 and demolished in 2001.

Ernest Thompson Seton lived in Cos Cob on an estate which is now a town park. Over 75 years ago what would eventually become the Boy Scouts of America was in part founded by him here.

On June 28, 1983, a 100-foot (30 m) elevated portion of Interstate 95 (the Mianus River Bridge) collapsed, killing and injuring several motorists. Interstate 95 is the principal highway between Maine and Florida, and one of the most heavily traveled roads in the country. Because the road was not fully reopened for six months, it created a bottleneck which affected the New York to Boston transportation corridor.

In 2006, NRG Energy Inc. of La Jolla, California, proposed adding additional capacity of 40 megawatts to the current 60 megawatt plant to supplement Connecticut Light and Power during peak periods in southwestern Fairfield County. Two additional jet turbines would be added to the existing plant in 2008.

== Demographics ==
=== 2020 census ===
As of the 2020 census, Cos Cob had a population of 6,873. The median age was 42.8 years. 25.3% of residents were under the age of 18 and 15.8% of residents were 65 years of age or older. For every 100 females there were 92.2 males, and for every 100 females age 18 and over there were 89.2 males age 18 and over.

100.0% of residents lived in urban areas, while 0.0% lived in rural areas.

There were 2,570 households in Cos Cob, of which 40.7% had children under the age of 18 living in them. Of all households, 59.0% were married-couple households, 12.9% were households with a male householder and no spouse or partner present, and 24.5% were households with a female householder and no spouse or partner present. About 22.6% of all households were made up of individuals and 11.2% had someone living alone who was 65 years of age or older.

There were 2,743 housing units, of which 6.3% were vacant. The homeowner vacancy rate was 1.3% and the rental vacancy rate was 6.2%.

Racial composition as of the 2020 census
Race	Number	Percent
White	5,292	77.0%
Black or African American	71	1.0%
American Indian and Alaska Native	7	0.1%
Asian	535	7.8%
Native Hawaiian and Other Pacific Islander	0	0.0%
Some other race	240	3.5%
Two or more races	728	10.6%
Hispanic or Latino (of any race)	723	10.5%

== Education ==
As with other parts of the Town of Greenwich, Cos Cob is in the Greenwich Public Schools school district. The district's comprehensive high school is Greenwich High School.

== Notable people ==
- Edwin Booth, brother of John Wilkes Booth and a famous actor of his day
- Mary McVicker Booth, actress
- Orestes H. Caldwell, one of the first members of the Federal Radio Commission
- Gary Dell'Abate, producer for The Howard Stern Show
- Jim Himes, Democratic congressman from Connecticut's 4th congressional district.
- Finn Murphy, author of The Long Haul
- Barbara O'Neil, actress
- Anya Seton, author of historical fiction
- Jerry Springer, TV show host, The Jerry Springer Show
- Barbara Tuchman, historian
- Frederick M. Warburg, investment banker

== Places of interest ==
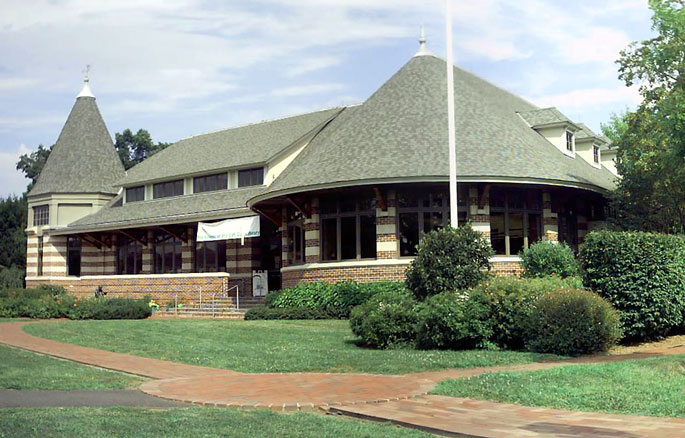
Cos Cob Library

- Bush-Holley House, the only National Historic Landmark in Greenwich; built in about 1730; listed in 1988
- Ernest Thompson Seton House

In addition to the Bush-Holley House, these sites in Cos Cob are listed by the National Register of Historic Places:

- Mianus River Railroad Bridge, built: 1904; listed: 1987
- Cos Cob Railroad Station, built: c. 1890; listed: 1989
- Strickland Road Historic District, Strickland Road; built: c. 1730–1938; listed: 1990
- Cos Cob Power Station, Sound Shore Drive; built: 1907; listed: 1990; demolished, 2000

== Community facilities ==
- The Cos Cob Library is a cultural center and community hub providing art gallery space, concert and lecture series, and free Wi-Fi access. Although of recent construction, the building evokes Richardsonian Romanesque design and is set in a pocket park landscaped by local volunteers.
- The neighborhood's ZIP Code is 06807. It has one post office.
- There are two public schools in Cos Cob: Cos Cob Elementary School, 390 pupils, and Central Middle School, 710 pupils (both as of 2010), though school boundaries cut across zip code boundaries and many students who live in Cos Cob attend other public schools in town.
- Cos Cob has a fire department staffed by both full-time salaried firefighters and volunteers.
- Cos Cob station is served by the New Haven Line of the Metro-North Railroad, a commuter rail service that runs between New Haven, Connecticut and New York City.

== In popular culture ==
- In Season 5 of AMC's TV series Mad Men, Cos Cob became the home to character Pete Campbell and his family.
- Gene Marshall, a doll designed by artist Mel Odom as a Hollywood Golden Age film star, is described as having spent her formative years in Cos Cob.
