= Mianus =

Mianus may refer to:

- Mianus River, in Westchester County, New York, and Fairfield County, Connecticut, U.S.
- Mianus, Connecticut, a neighborhood in Greenwich, Connecticut, U.S.
