= Riverside, Connecticut =

Census-designated place in Connecticut, United States

Coordinates: 41.033°N 73.579°W

- Census-designated place
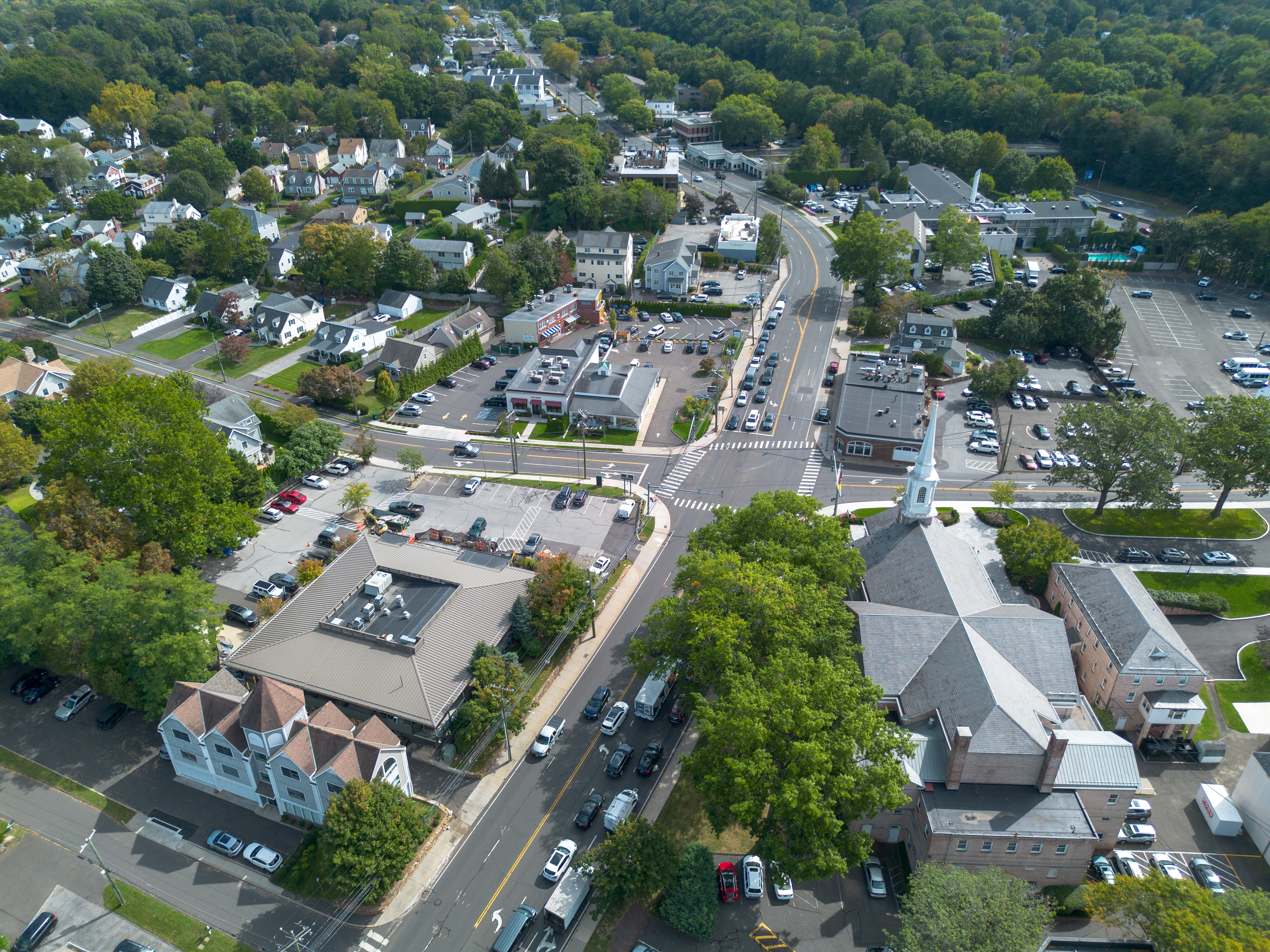
- Riverside in 2025

- Location in Fairfield County and the state of Connecticut.
- Country: United States
- U.S. state: Connecticut
- County: Fairfield
- NECTA: Bridgeport-Stamford-Norwalk
- Region: Western CT
- Town: Greenwich

Area
  - Total: 3.23 sq mi (8.36 km^{2})
  - Land: 2.421 sq mi (6.271 km^{2})
  - Water: 0.81 sq mi (2.09 km^{2})

Population (2020)
  - Total: 8,843
  - Density: 3,652/sq mi (1,410/km^{2})
- Time zone: UTC-5:00 (Eastern)
  - Summer (DST): UTC-4:00 (Eastern)
- Area code: 203
- FIPS code: 09-64530
- GNIS feature ID: 2631574

Riverside is a neighborhood/section in the town of Greenwich in Fairfield County, Connecticut, United States. As of the 2020 census, it had a population of 8,843.

The town of Greenwich is one political and taxing body, but consists of several distinct sections or neighborhoods, such as Banksville, Byram, Cos Cob, Glenville, Mianus, Old Greenwich, Riverside, and Greenwich (sometimes referred to as central, or downtown, Greenwich). Of these neighborhoods, three (Cos Cob, Old Greenwich, and Riverside) have separate postal names and ZIP codes.

== History ==
Riverside has two sites listed on the National Register of Historic Places:

- Riverside Avenue Bridge, Riverside Avenue over the New Haven Line railroad tracks; built in 1894; listed in 1977.
- Samuel Ferris House, Cary Road; built in about 1760; listed in 1989.

== Geography ==
According to the U.S. Census Bureau, Riverside has a total area of 3.23 mi^{2} (8.36 km^{2}), of which 2.42 mi^{2} (6.27 km^{2}) is land and 0.81 mi^{2} (2.09 km^{2}), or 24.98%, is water.

Riverside is bordered to the west by Greenwich and Cos Cob, both across the Mianus River. The town's eastern border is with Old Greenwich.

== Education ==
As with other parts of the Town of Greenwich, Riverside is in the Greenwich Public Schools school district. The district's comprehensive high school is Greenwich High School.

The Riverside area has two elementary schools, Riverside School and the International School at Dundee, and one middle school, Eastern Middle School, located in Riverside. Public school students attend the sole high school in the district, Greenwich High School, in Greenwich, Connecticut.

The Japanese School of New York (Greenwich Japanese School) is in Riverside, where it moved to in 2022.

== Demographics ==
=== 2020 census ===
As of the 2020 census, Riverside had a population of 8,843. The median age was 41.4 years. 30.6% of residents were under the age of 18 and 14.8% were 65 years of age or older. For every 100 females there were 96.3 males, and for every 100 females age 18 and over there were 90.6 males age 18 and over.

100.0% of residents lived in urban areas, while 0.0% lived in rural areas.

There were 2,939 households in Riverside, of which 47.0% had children under the age of 18 living in them. Of all households, 67.5% were married-couple households, 9.5% were households with a male householder and no spouse or partner present, and 21.0% were households with a female householder and no spouse or partner present. About 20.0% of all households were made up of individuals and 11.6% had someone living alone who was 65 years of age or older.

The average household size was 3.11 persons. There were 3,119 housing units, of which 5.8% were vacant. The homeowner vacancy rate was 1.3% and the rental vacancy rate was 3.7%.

Racial composition as of the 2020 census
Race	Number	Percent
White	6,705	75.8%
Black or African American	95	1.1%
American Indian and Alaska Native	11	0.1%
Asian	901	10.2%
Native Hawaiian and Other Pacific Islander	2	0.0%
Some other race	202	2.3%
Two or more races	927	10.5%
Hispanic or Latino (of any race)	929	10.5%

== Transportation ==
The neighborhood is served by the Riverside Railroad Station on the Metro-North line, although some residents are closer to the Old Greenwich Train Station.

Interstate 95 passes through the neighborhood.

== Notable people ==
Well-known residents of Riverside include television personalities Lara Spencer and Kathie Lee Gifford. Former residents include Olympic gold-medal ice skater Dorothy Hamill and Philadelphia Flyers forward Cam Atkinson.
