= Cos Cob station =

Metro-North Railroad station in Connecticut

Cos Cob
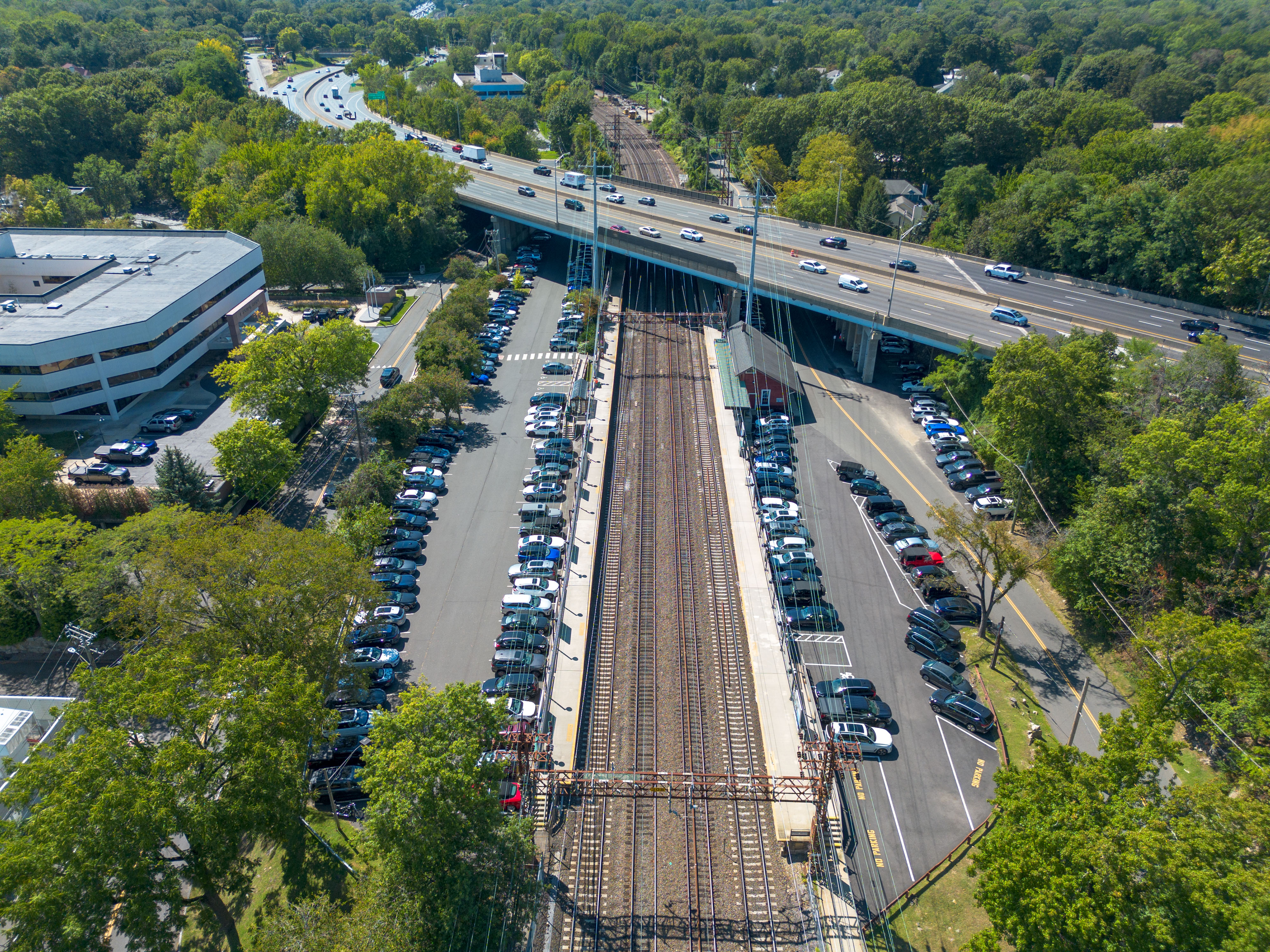
- Cos Cob station in 2025

General information
- Location: 1 Station Drive; Cos Cob, Greenwich, Connecticut
- Coordinates: 41.03123°N 73.598313°W
- Owner: ConnDOT
- Line: ConnDOT New Haven Line (Northeast Corridor)
- Platforms: 2 side platforms
- Tracks: 4

Construction
- Parking: 567 spaces
- Cycle facilities: Yes

Other information
- Fare zone: 15

History
- Opened: December 25, 1848
- Rebuilt: 1890

Key dates
- January 15, 1972: Station agent eliminated

Passengers
- 2018: 928 daily boardings

Services
| Preceding station | Metro-North Railroad | Following station |
|---|---|---|
| Greenwich toward Grand Central | New Haven Line | Riverside toward Stamford |
Former services
| Preceding station | New York, New Haven and Hartford Railroad | Following station |
|---|---|---|
| Greenwich toward New York | Main Line | Riverside toward New Haven |
- Cos Cob Railroad Station
- U.S. National Register of Historic Places
- Built: 1894
- Architectural style: Stick/Eastlake
- NRHP reference No.: 89000928
- Added to NRHP: August 28, 1989
Location

Cos Cob station is a commuter rail station on the Metro-North Railroad's New Haven Line, located in the Cos Cob district of Greenwich, Connecticut.

== History ==
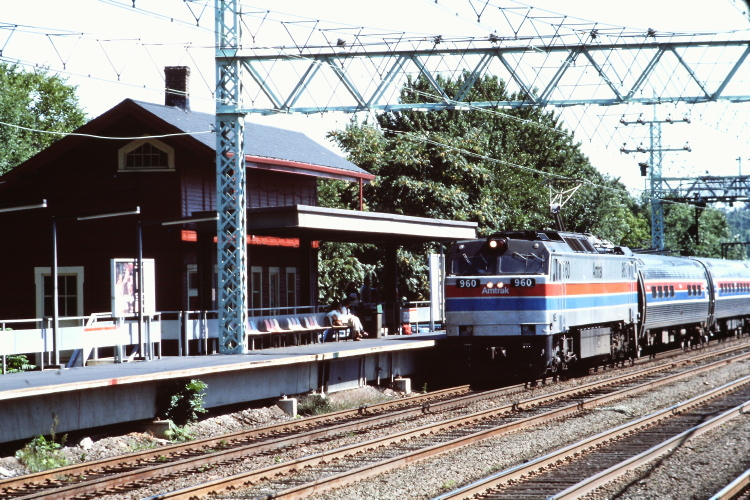
An Amtrak train passing Cos Cob in 1975

On December 25, 1848, the last section of track on the railroad from New Haven to New York was completed over the Cos Cob Bridge. The first trial run was made on that day.

The New York and New Haven Railroad was merged into the New York, New Haven and Hartford Railroad in 1872, and the station became part of that railroad. Beginning in 1907, the NYNH&H built the Cos Cob power plant as part of an effort to electrify the main line. As with all New Haven Line stations along the Northeast Corridor, the station became a Penn Central station upon acquisition by Penn Central Railroad in 1969, and eventually became part of the MTA's Metro-North Railroad in 1983. The station was added to the National Register of Historic Places in 1989.

== Station layout ==
The station has two high-level side platforms, each six cars long, serving the outer tracks of the four-track Northeast Corridor. The station has 567 parking spaces, of which 361 are owned by the state.

Built in about 1894, the station house is a modest wood-frame structure measuring about 50 by 20 feet (15.2 m × 6.1 m). It has a clapboarded exterior, and an asymmetrical gabled roof with a short face toward the track, caused by the loss of the original platform shelter. The interior retains most of its original finishes. It was listed on the National Register of Historic Places in 1989 as Cos Cob Railroad Station. The nearby Mianus River Railroad Bridge is also listed on the National Register. The Cos Cob Power Station, a former New Haven Railroad electrical substation on the western edge of that bridge, is also NRHP-registered despite being demolished during the turn of the millennium.

== See also ==
- National Register of Historic Places listings in Greenwich, Connecticut
