= Byram, Connecticut =

Census-designated place in Connecticut, United States

Coordinates: 41°00′15″N 73°39′13″W

- Census-designated place
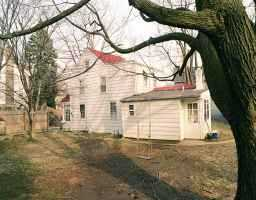
- Phebe Seaman House (1794), 170 Byram Road

- Location in Fairfield County and the state of Connecticut.
- Country: United States
- U.S. state: Connecticut
- County: Fairfield
- NECTA: Bridgeport-Stamford-Norwalk
- Region: Western CT
- Town: Greenwich

Area
  - Total: 0.86 sq mi (2.23 km^{2})
  - Land: 0.80 sq mi (2.07 km^{2})
  - Water: 0.062 sq mi (0.16 km^{2})

Population (2020)
  - Total: 4,493
  - Density: 5,620/sq mi (2,170/km^{2})
- Time zone: Eastern
- Area code: 203
- FIPS code: 09-10660
- GNIS feature ID: 2631559

Byram is a neighborhood/section and census-designated place (CDP) in the town of Greenwich in Fairfield County, Connecticut, United States. As of the 2020 census, Byram had a population of 4,493. An endcap of Connecticut's Gold Coast, Byram is the southernmost point in the town of Greenwich and the U.S. state of Connecticut. It is separated from Port Chester, Westchester County, New York, by the Byram River. Byram was once known as East Port Chester.

== History ==
The town of Greenwich is one political and taxing body, but consists of several distinct sections or neighborhoods, such as Banksville, Byram, Cos Cob, Glenville, Mianus, Old Greenwich, Riverside and Greenwich (sometimes referred to as central, or downtown, Greenwich). Of these neighborhoods, three (Cos Cob, Old Greenwich, and Riverside) have separate postal names and ZIP codes.

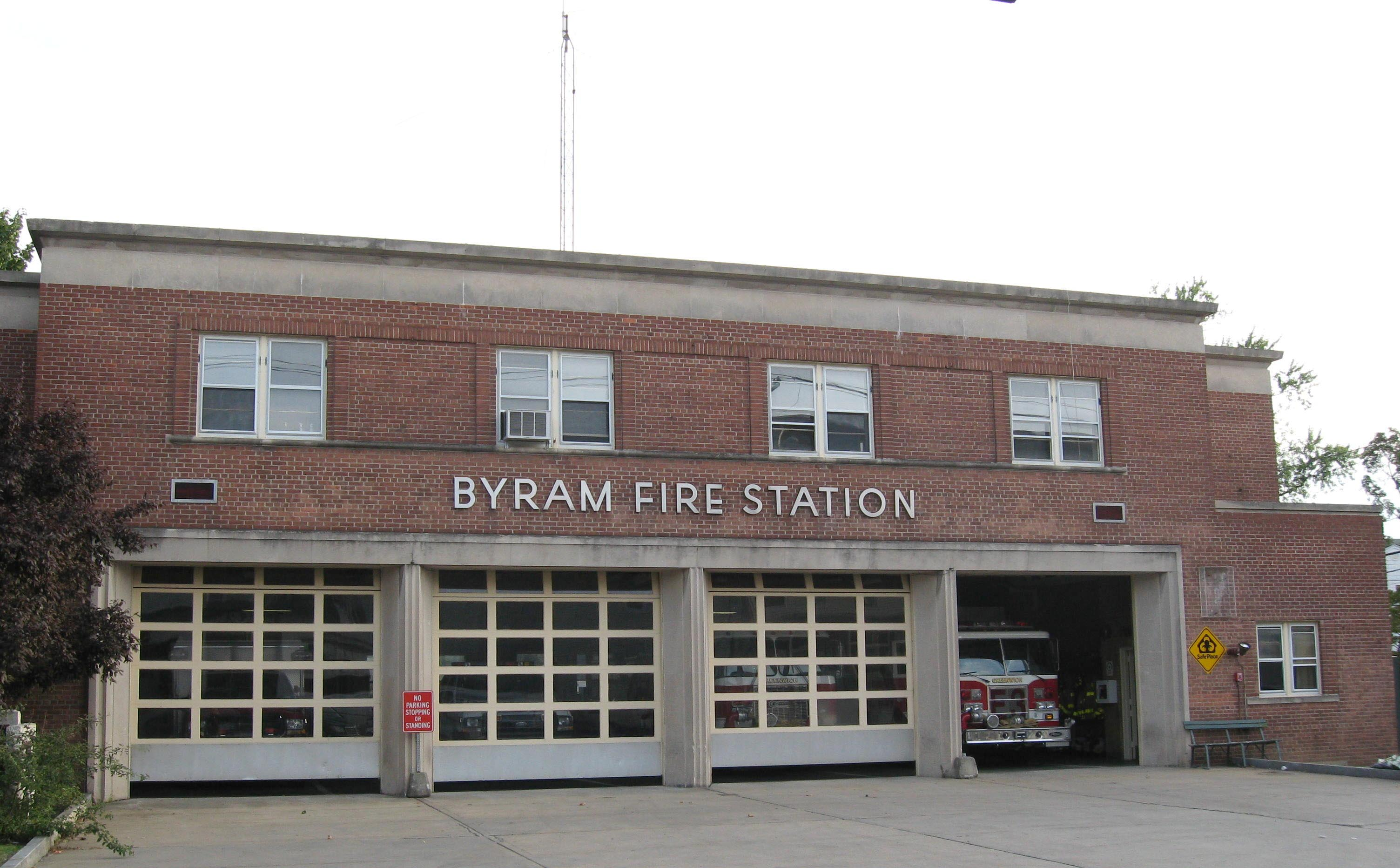
Byram Fire Station, Greenwich Fire Station # 3

Byram Quarry, now closed, supplied stone for the Brooklyn Bridge, the base of the Statue of Liberty and St. Roch Church.

== Geography ==
According to the United States Census Bureau, Byram has a total area of 0.861 square miles (2.23 km^{2}), of which 0.798 square miles (2.07 km^{2}) is land and 0.063 square miles (0.16 km^{2}), or 7.32%, is water.

== Demographics ==
=== 2020 census ===
As of the 2020 census, Byram had a population of 4,493. The median age was 40.9 years. 22.2% of residents were under the age of 18 and 15.3% of residents were 65 years of age or older. For every 100 females there were 98.2 males, and for every 100 females age 18 and over there were 96.8 males age 18 and over.

100.0% of residents lived in urban areas, while 0.0% lived in rural areas.

There were 1,681 households in Byram, of which 31.6% had children under the age of 18 living in them. Of all households, 45.7% were married-couple households, 17.8% were households with a male householder and no spouse or partner present, and 28.8% were households with a female householder and no spouse or partner present. About 26.8% of all households were made up of individuals and 9.3% had someone living alone who was 65 years of age or older.

There were 1,802 housing units, of which 6.7% were vacant. The homeowner vacancy rate was 0.0% and the rental vacancy rate was 3.1%.

Racial composition as of the 2020 census
Race	Number	Percent
White	2,398	53.4%
Black or African American	111	2.5%
American Indian and Alaska Native	36	0.8%
Asian	274	6.1%
Native Hawaiian and Other Pacific Islander	7	0.2%
Some other race	932	20.7%
Two or more races	735	16.4%
Hispanic or Latino (of any race)	1,576	35.1%

== Education ==
As with other parts of the Town of Greenwich, Bryam is in the Greenwich Public Schools school district. The district's comprehensive high school is Greenwich High School.

== Culture ==
A scene from the movie The Good Shepherd was shot in Byram.

== Places ==
Byram has three sites on the National Register of Historic Places:

- Phebe Seaman House (1794), 170 Byram Road; built c. 1794
- Thomas Lyon House — 1 Byram Road; built: c. 1695, listed: 1977
- Byram School — Western Junior Highway; built: 1925, listed: 1990

== Library ==
Byram Shubert Library
