= Old Greenwich station =

Metro-North Railroad station in Connecticut

Old Greenwich
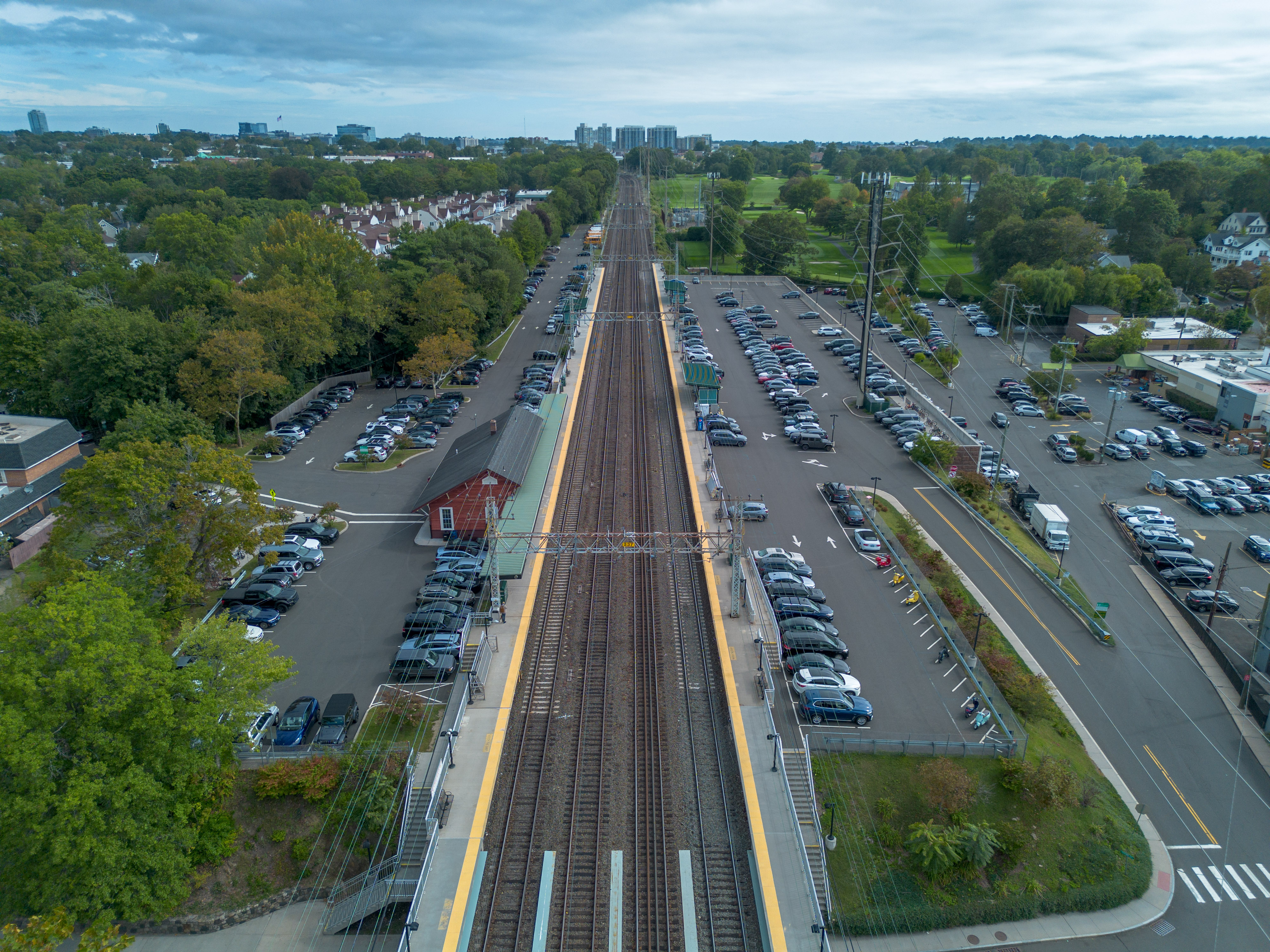
- Old Greenwich station in 2025

General information
- Location: 160 Sound Beach Avenue; Greenwich, Connecticut
- Owner: ConnDOT
- Line: ConnDOT New Haven Line (Northeast Corridor)
- Platforms: 2 side platforms
- Tracks: 4
- Connections: Connecticut Transit Stamford: 11, 24

Construction
- Parking: 578 spaces

Other information
- Fare zone: 15

History
- Opened: 1892
- Former names: Sound Beach (1872–1931)

Passengers
- 2018: 1,107 daily boardings

Services
Preceding station	Metro-North Railroad	Following station
Riverside toward Grand Central	New Haven Line	Stamford Terminus
Former services
Preceding station	New York, New Haven and Hartford Railroad	Following station
Riverside toward New York	Main Line	Stamford toward New Haven
- Sound Beach Railroad Station
- U.S. National Register of Historic Places
- Coordinates: 41°02′00″N 73°34′04″W
- Architectural style: Stick/Eastlake
- NRHP reference No.: 89000929
- Added to NRHP: 1989
Location

Old Greenwich station is a commuter rail station served by the Metro-North Railroad New Haven Line, located in the Old Greenwich neighborhood of Greenwich, Connecticut. The station has two side platforms, each ten cars long, which serve the outer tracks of the four-track Northeast Corridor.

== History ==
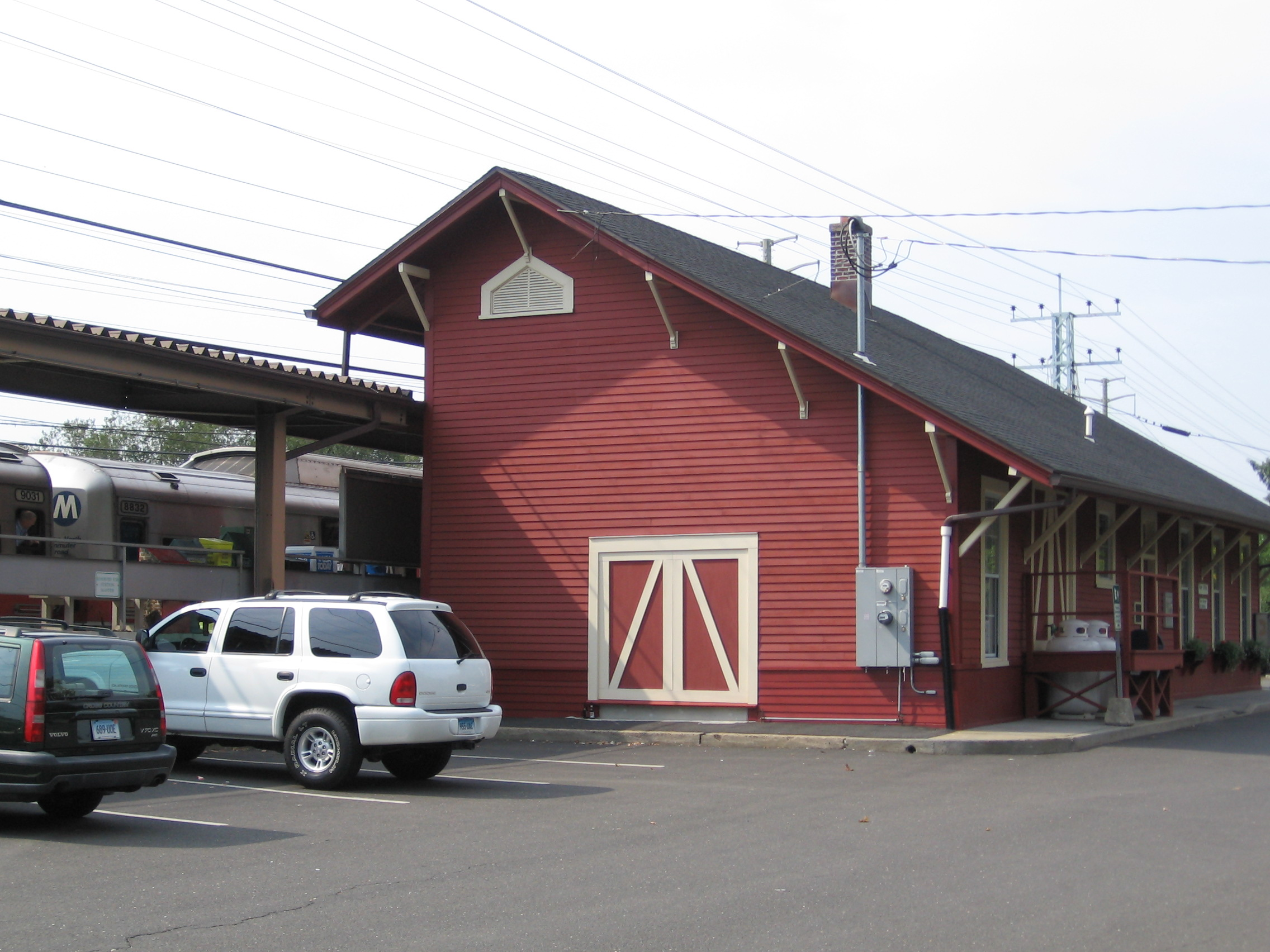
The station building in 2007

The station was built in 1872 as Sound Beach, named after nearby Greenwich Point Beach. It was renamed Old Greenwich in 1931. The current station building, built about 1894, is a well-preserved example of the New Haven Railroad's period stations, with a utilitarian interior and exterior nods to period Victorian architectural styles. It was added to the National Register of Historic Places in 1989 as Sound Beach Railroad Station. The station formerly had six-car-length high-level platforms, which could not serve all cars on some trains.

In 2009, Metro-North began planning a project to replace structurally deficient railroad bridges over South Beach Avenue and Tomac Avenue. The scope of the project was later expanded to include platform extensions to 10-car length, as well as an expansion of the south parking lot. Notice to proceed on the $14.9 million project was given in August 2014, and construction began the next May. After several delays, the project was completed in late 2019. A retaining wall built for the parking lot expansion attracted criticism for its stark design, with comparisons to the Berlin Wall and The Wall from Game of Thrones.
