= Phebe Seaman House =

Coordinates: 41.0072°N 73.6533°W

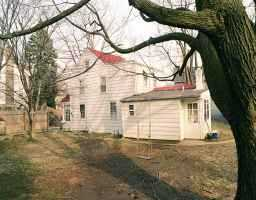
View from the northwest in 2003

The Phebe Seaman House is located in the Byram section of Greenwich, Connecticut. It was built in 1794 and is one of the oldest structures in Byram. It is also believed to be the Seth Mead homestead possibly.

The house is a rare example of a relatively intact vernacular Colonial dwelling. Its 2 1/2-story, 3-bay frame is covered with original wide clapboards and reveals evidence of the original saltbox roof on both side elevations where the ends of the older clapboards show a stepped pattern depicting the original rear slope of the house before the flat-roofed second-story addition was constructed. The southern side elevation, facing Nickel Street, features a massive fieldstone chimney that was built flush with the outside wall but left exposed at the first story. The bricked-in hole was most likely the result of the removal of a projection that held a beehive oven. Such a projection was found in one of the Lyon houses in nearby Port Chester, New York, which could indicate a family building custom since Phebe Seaman was a Lyon by birth. The windows are rather small and six over six in pattern, also showing a rather anachronistic Colonial trait. The gabled entry foyer is a 20th-century alteration.

The interior spaces include a shallow cellar that shows both original and replacement beams, as well as the underside of the original wide plank flooring. The first- and second-story rooms all feature very low ceilings, which gives the house a diminutive appearance, despite its 2 1/2-story height. The first floor’s front room features a large, reworked fireplace which nevertheless retains its rather massive wood lintel. The second floor’s front room shows corner posts, a protruding central post, and a peculiar beam along the north wall, several feet below the ceiling. A few original hand-hewn rafters remain in the attic, but most have been replaced. The corner lot is attractively landscaped with shade trees, ornamental trees and shrubs. The property also features a well with a red roof matching that of the house.
