= Riverside station (Metro-North) =

Metro-North Railroad station in Connecticut

Riverside
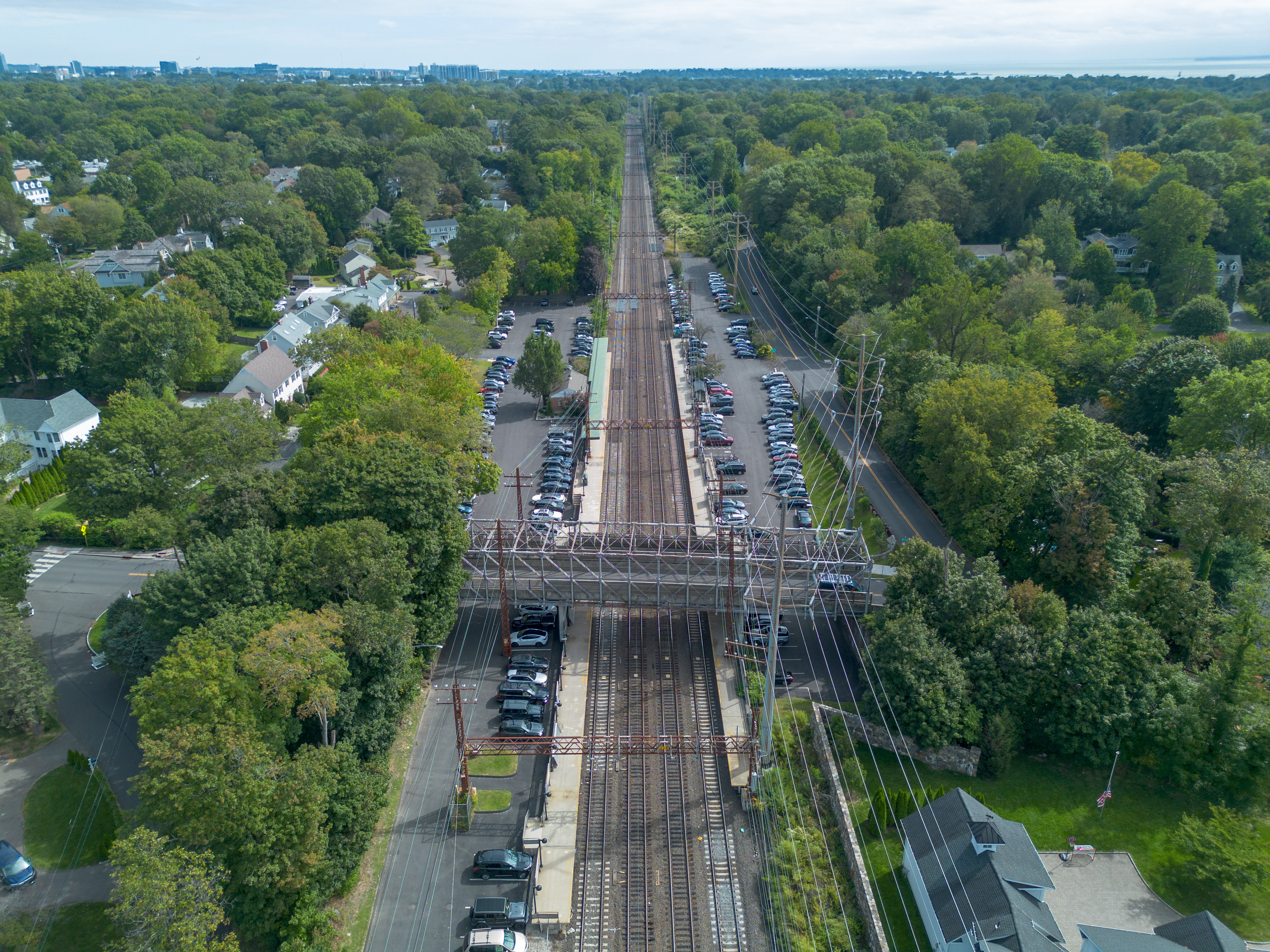
- Riverside station in 2025

General information
- Location: 1 Riverside Avenue; Riverside, Greenwich, Connecticut
- Coordinates: 41.03175°N 73.5872°W
- Owner: ConnDOT
- Line: ConnDOT New Haven Line (Northeast Corridor)
- Platforms: 2 side platforms
- Tracks: 4

Construction
- Parking: 324 spaces

Other information
- Fare zone: 15

Key dates
- January 15, 1972: Station agent eliminated

Passengers
- 2018: 679 daily boardings

Services
Preceding station	Metro-North Railroad	Following station
Cos Cob toward Grand Central	New Haven Line	Old Greenwich toward Stamford
Former services
Preceding station	New York, New Haven and Hartford Railroad	Following station
Cos Cob toward New York	Main Line	Sound Beach toward New Haven
Location

Riverside station is a commuter rail stop on the Metro-North Railroad's New Haven Line, located in the Riverside area of Greenwich, Connecticut. The Riverside Avenue Bridge crosses over the west end of the station platforms. The station has two high-level side platforms each six cars long. It has 324 parking spaces, 307 owned by the state.
