= Greenwich station (Metro-North) =

Railroad station in Greenwich, Connecticut, US

Greenwich
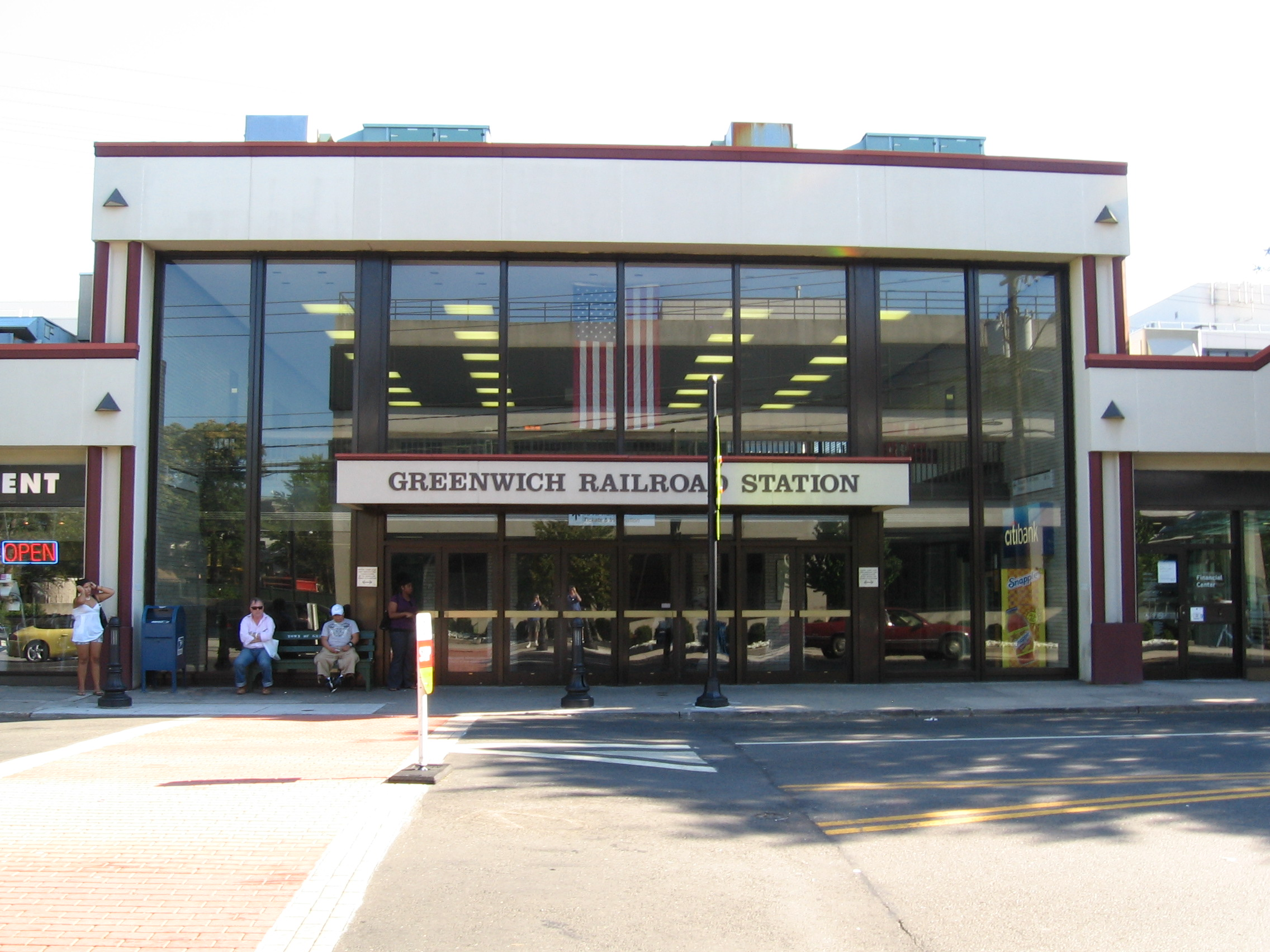
- Greenwich station in August 2008

General information
- Location: 20 Railroad Avenue; Greenwich, Connecticut
- Coordinates: 41.0214°N 73.6256°W
- Owner: State of Connecticut (platforms); Private ownership (station building)
- Line: ConnDOT New Haven Line (Northeast Corridor)
- Platforms: 2 side platforms
- Tracks: 4
- Connections: CT Transit Stamford: 11, I-BUS Express; Norwalk Transit District: Greenwich Commuter Connection - Central Loop, West Loop

Construction
- Parking: 1,274 spaces
- Accessible: Yes

Other information
- Fare zone: 15

History
- Opened: December 25, 1848
- Rebuilt: March 5, 1970

Passengers
- 2018: 4,032 daily boardings

Services
Preceding station	Metro-North Railroad	Following station
Port Chester toward Grand Central	New Haven Line	Cos Cob toward Stamford
Harlem–125th Street toward Grand Central	New Canaan Branch weekday service	Stamford toward New Canaan
Former services
Preceding station	New York, New Haven and Hartford Railroad	Following station
Port Chester toward New York	Main Line	Cos Cob toward New Haven
Location

Greenwich station is a commuter rail station on the Metro-North Railroad New Haven Line located in Greenwich, Connecticut.

== Station layout ==
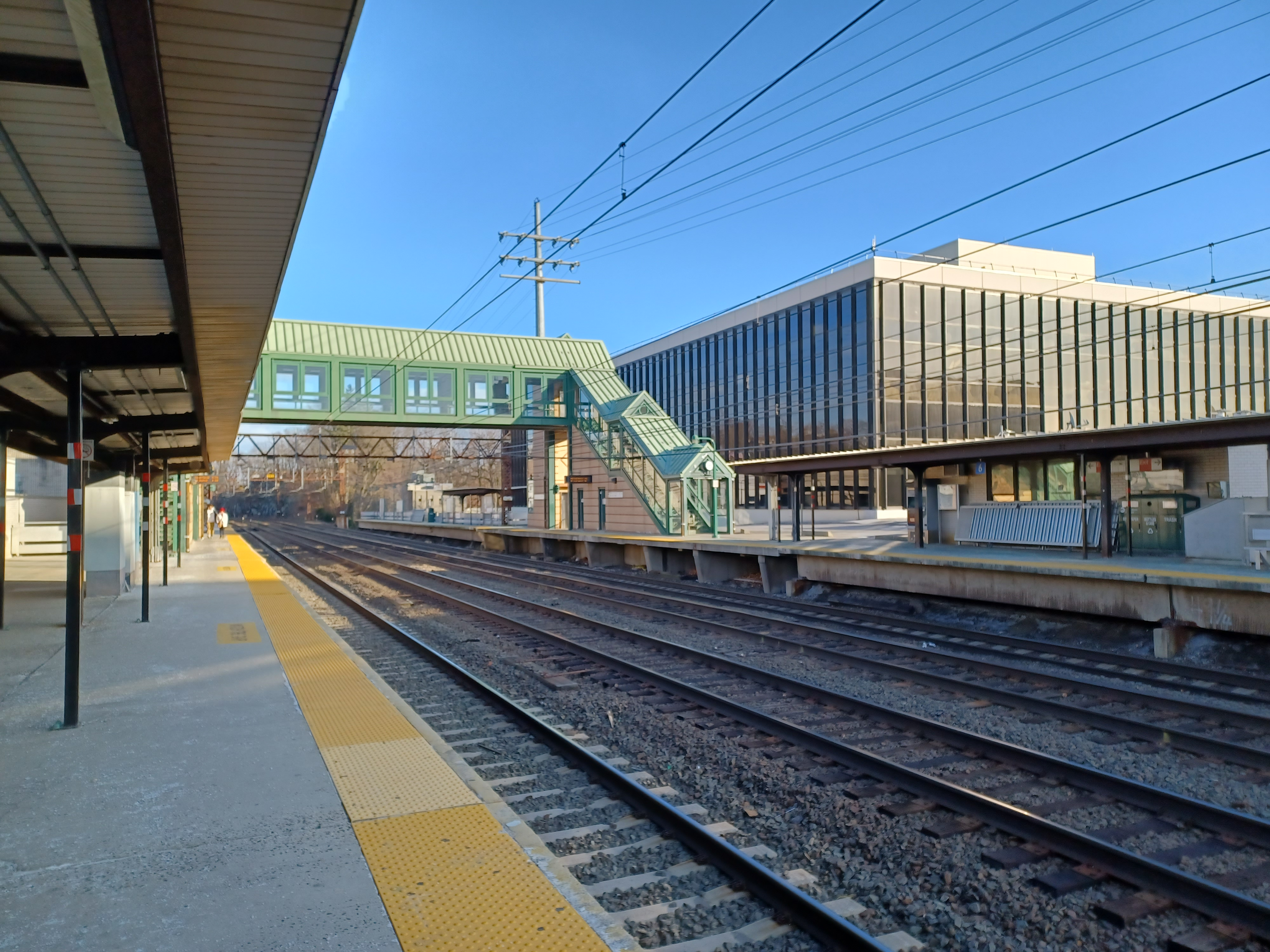
Station platforms in 2022

The station has two high-level side platforms, each 10 cars long, serving the outer tracks of the four-track Northeast Corridor.

Unlike most stations on the line, Greenwich station is owned and maintained by multiple agencies and organizations. The State of Connecticut owns the station's platforms, Metro-North maintains the platforms, but the station building and parking facilities are privately owned.

== History ==
The Penn Central Transportation Company opened the current station building on March 5, 1970, replacing an older structure, built by the New York & New Haven Railroad, which was demolished. As built the new building was a two-story structure with 8,550-square-foot (794 m^{2}) of space. The station was the centerpiece of Greenwich Plaza, a new mixed-use retail development. A proposed $45 million project, of which plans were shown in July 2019, would replace that building with a new station on the south side of the tracks.

The station building reopened on January 30, 2026, after renovations.
