= Riverside Avenue Bridge (Greenwich, Connecticut) =

- U.S. National Register of Historic Places
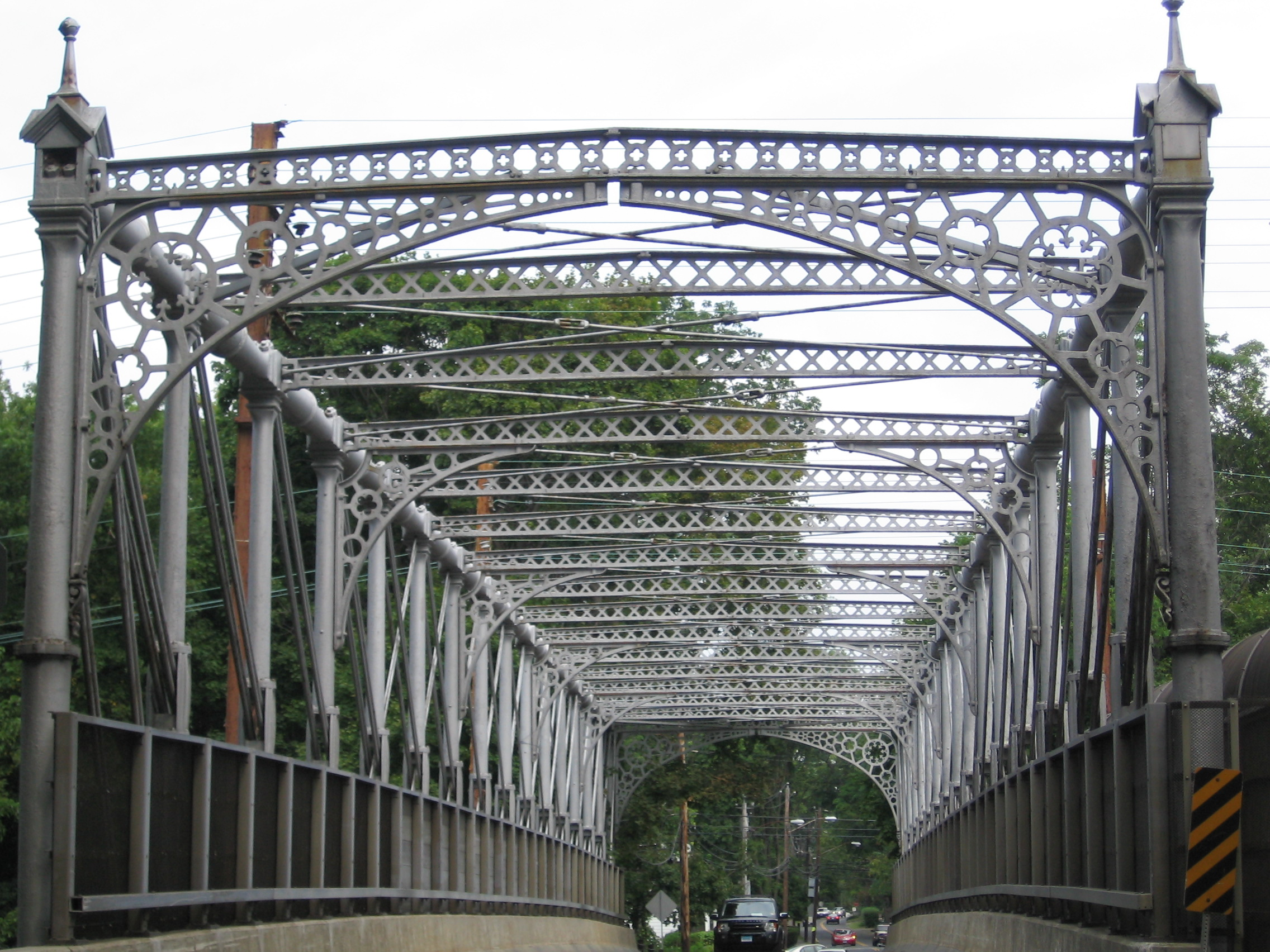
- Riverside Avenue Bridge, looking North

- Location within Connecticut Location within the United States
- Location: Riverside Avenue and Railroad Tracks, Greenwich, Connecticut
- Coordinates: 41°01′54″N 73°35′17″W
- Area: 0.1 acres (0.040 ha)
- Built: 1871
- Architect: Francis C. Lowthrop; Keystone Bridge Co.
- Architectural style: Pratt truss
- NRHP reference No.: 77001391
- Added to NRHP: August 29, 1977

The Riverside Avenue Bridge is the only cast-iron bridge in Connecticut and one of a small number still in use in the United States. It carries Riverside Avenue over the New Haven Line railroad tracks in the Riverside section of Greenwich, Connecticut. The bridge was part of an earlier span built in 1871 over the Housatonic River by the New York and New Haven Railroad, and when that bridge was replaced, part of it was erected in Riverside in 1895. It was placed on the National Register of Historic Places in 1977.

Called "an important engineering landmark" by Cultural Resource Management, a periodical published by the National Park Service, the bridge carries one of the primary streets in this section of town, and is owned by the Connecticut state government.

== History ==
The structure was originally part of a six-span railroad bridge built over the Housatonic in Stratford, Connecticut, by the Keystone Bridge Company of Pittsburgh, Pennsylvania. Engineer F. C. Lowthorp designed that structure. The New York, New Haven and Hartford Railroad, successor to the New York and New Haven Railroad in 1872, replaced the river bridge in 1884 and, 11 years later, erected this span again in Riverside, adjacent to the Riverside train station.

The double-intersection Pratt truss bridge is constructed of composite cast-iron and wrought-iron elements with decorative brackets and was considered both elegant and durable at the time of its construction. As locomotives increased in weight and as the weaknesses of cast-iron bridges became more apparent, the bridges were replaced. The bridge is a rare survivor from that era.

On September 29, 1977, the bridge was added to the national list of Registered Historic Places.

By 1986, vibrations and isolated corrosion in the trusses caused traffic officials and local residents to start worrying about its safety. (This was only a few years after the Mianus River Bridge collapse on Interstate 95 just a few miles away.)

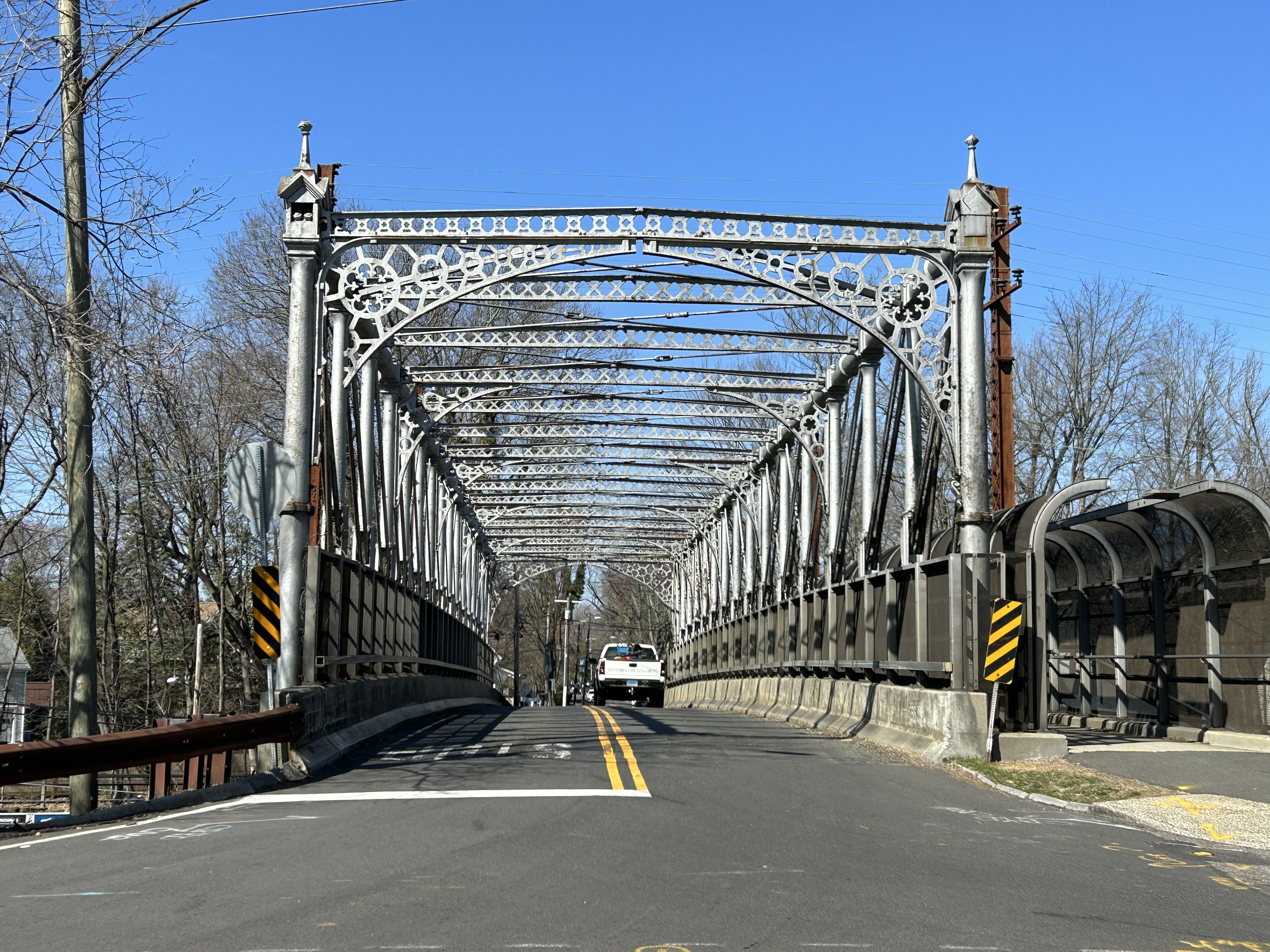
The bridge in 2023

The original design documents couldn't be found, so engineers from Frederic R. Harris, Inc., relied on ultrasonics to determine the strength of the bridge, and the tests revealed that rehabilitation work was necessary. The design for the new work was later called an "innovative engineering solution" by Cultural Resource Management. To allow for the preservation of the distinctive appearance of the bridge while continuing its use for traffic, a new bridge was built inside the old one, with replacement of the existing wooden deck by a new, pre-assembled concrete structure which would carry all vehicular loads. Notches were cut in the steel crossbeams on the bottom of the truss, allowing a new concrete deck thick and strong enough to carry traffic safely but without significantly altering the look of the original truss design. But the original superstructure only carries its own weight.

The $2.7 million rehabilitation project began in August 1988. "Contractors carefully rolled the new girder system into place using one crane to pull the bridge and one to steer the bridge", according to Cultural Resource Management a publication of the U.S.National Park Service. As part of the work, the entire superstructure was cleaned and painted.

The bridge's design includes a number of innovations.

== See also ==
- National Register of Historic Places listings in Greenwich, Connecticut
- List of bridges documented by the Historic American Engineering Record in Connecticut
- List of bridges on the National Register of Historic Places in Connecticut
