= International School at Dundee =

The International School at Dundee
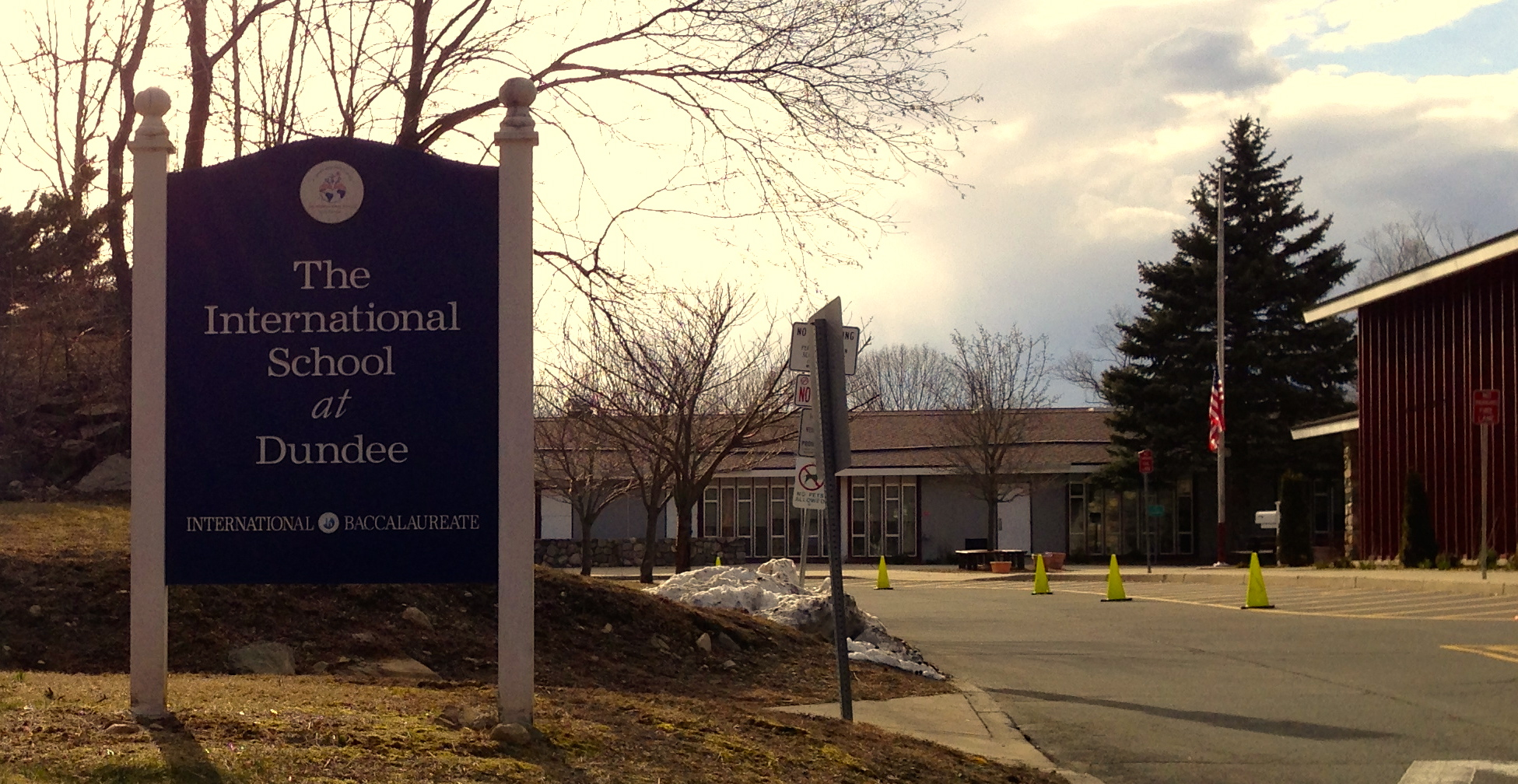

Location
- Riverside, Connecticut, United States; 41.0516°N 73.5763°W

Information
- Type: Public, Magnet, IB
- School district: Greenwich Public Schools
- Principal: Philip Hammack
- Grades: K-5
- Enrollment: 366
- Colors: Blue and red
- Mascot: Dragon
- Website: www.greenwichschools.org/isd

The International School at Dundee is a magnet elementary school in Riverside, Connecticut, United States. The school belongs to the Greenwich Public Schools system and serves roughly 366 students. It also participates in the International Baccalaureate program, and was the first school in Connecticut to be IB authorized. In 2012 it was one of five Greenwich public schools to be in Connecticut's list of top-performing schools.

== History ==
The International School at Dundee opened in Fall 2000 and became an IB World School in June 2003.

Dundee elementary school first opened in September, 1962.

== Student population ==
Of the approximate 366 students who attend ISD, two thirds of the student body is composed of students in its district while the other third is made up of students who have applied to the school. Of those who apply, priority is given to those who live in the Eastern Middle School section of the Greenwich school district.

According to 2011 state test scores, the racial demographics of the school are as follows:

- White: 66%
- Hispanic: 13%
- Asian: 13%
- Black: 2%

== Curriculum ==
ISD's curriculum follows the basic Greenwich Public Schools elementary school curriculum which is integrated with the International Baccalaureate Primary Years Programme (IBPYP) model. The school's stated mission is to encourage continuous learning among its students as well as help them become responsible citizens of the world. This involves goals that include the students becoming "thinkers, communicators, inquirers, principled, reflective, open-minded, balanced, risk-takers, caring, and knowledgable[sic]." ISD expects the staff to embody these characteristics as well. The curriculum emphasizes the development of "inquiry" among the school's students. This is a chief principle of the IB program. ISD's website describes the inquiry process as involving "planned experiences that provide opportunities for students to pose questions and gather information."

=== Required subjects ===
Daily and weekly lessons include:

- Language Arts – Helps students develop communication skills including reading, writing, listening, and speaking.
- Library Media and Technology – Helps students develop technological and media based skills including basic computer and keyboard skills, internet and library research, and creating multimedia presentations.
- Math
- Music and Visual Art – Includes goals of helping students learn to express themselves, understand how artistic choices are made, and understanding the artistic process as well as its impact.
  - Band and chorus programs are offered for fourth and fifth grade students.
  - The orchestra program is offered for students in grades 3-5.
- Physical Education – A program adopting the six National Standards for Physical Education.
- Science – Students develop a basic knowledge of living organisms and their relationship with the physical world as well as how to apply scientific knowledge to everyday life.
- Social Studies – Includes lessons on social interaction, geography, research, and critical thinking, taught in the context of history.
- Spanish

English to Speakers of Other Languages (ESOL) is also offered for international students.

=== Advanced Learning Program ===
The Advanced Learning Program is offered in all Greenwich Public Schools on the elementary level. The program is for students considered "talented and gifted" after consensus of teachers, school psychologists, and program facilitators, and after evaluation of standardized test scores. This program offers accelerated learning activities and other activities for enrichment.

=== Fifth grade IB exhibition ===
The Fifth Grade Exhibition is a research project in which ISD's fifth grade students apply the research and inquiry skills that they have acquired throughout their elementary school years. It is a student-led project in which the fifth graders explore a topic of their choosing in small groups. A teacher mentor guides each group during the completion of the project and meets with them once a week to track their progress.

Phases of the exhibition:

- Phase One: Students are presented with the teachers' expectations for the project and are given examples of acceptable topics and how the research can be presented. Students then select topics for the exhibition and form small groups that are then paired with teacher mentors. Students then create a planner and a journal to use throughout their completion of the project.
- Phase Two: Students begin researching their topics and develop ideas for their presentation with the help of their classroom teachers and the Library Media Specialist. They are expected to conduct research outside of school with trips to museums and other venues appropriate for further understanding of their topic.
- Phase 3: Students create their exhibition with the information they compiled during their research. Each group then creates an informative presentation with a creative component. The school's explanation of the project says, "Their creative component could be a movie, a TV commercial, a construction project, a fashion show, an art project, a musical number, a skit or anything else they can come up with as a manner of expressing their knowledge and new understandings."
- Phase 4: Students revise and rehearse their presentations. Then over the course of a few days students present their exhibition projects to their teachers, parents, and fellow students.

== Campus ==
In the 2014–2015 school year ISD opened its new "learning commons" library which offers a wider range of activities compared to traditional libraries.

== Extracurricular programs ==
- Beach Picnic
- Before and Afters Program – Students are offered unique classes before and after school, some of which include music, art, or sports (seasonal). This program is sponsored by the school's Parent Teacher Association.
- Scholastic Book Fair
- Classical Cafe – Occasionally, students are treated to a musical performance followed by a question and answer period during their lunch.
- Ice Cream Social
- ISD Fun Run and Tag Sale – A fundraiser to benefit organizations including The Salvation Army, The Peace Corps, Neighbor to Neighbor, and Pacific House.
- Math Night – Math-related games are played by students.
- Monster Mash – A Halloween event featuring a DJ, costume contests, games, and crafts for ISD students and their families.
- Movie Night
- Parents' Night Out
- The Renaissance Fair – An annual event featuring Renaissance-themed activities, food, and performances.
- Science Night – Science-related demonstrations as well as hands-on activities are offered for ISD students.
- Skate Night
