= List of highest-income urban areas in the United States =

The following is a list of the highest-income urban areas in the United States. The U.S. Census Bureau defines two types of urban areas. They are listed below, along with their Census definitions.

- Urbanized Area (UA), an area consisting of a central place(s) and adjacent territory with a general population density of at least 1,000 people per square mile of land area that together have a minimum residential population of at least 50,000 people. The Census Bureau uses published criteria to determine the qualification and boundaries of UAs.
- Urban Cluster (UC), a densely settled territory that has at least 2,500 people but fewer than 50,000.

== Urban areas ranked by per capita income ==
=== Urban areas of any population ===
Rank	Place	Population	Per Capita Income
1	Scottsdale North, AZ Urban Cluster	2,692	71,408
2	Union township (Porter County), IN Urban Cluster	2,593	59,452
3	Key Biscayne, FL Urban Cluster	10,513	54,081
4	Rancho Murieta, CA Urban Cluster	2,634	48,722
5	Fair Oaks Ranch, TX Urban Cluster	4,437	45,388
6	San Rafael—Novato, CA Urbanized Area	232,836	45,384
7	Richland, MI Urban Cluster	3,560	44,558
8	Marco Island, FL Urban Cluster	15,593	42,675
9	Aspen, CO Urban Cluster	6,186	42,123
10	Lakeway, TX Urban Cluster	17,363	42,039
11	Discovery Bay, CA Urban Cluster	9,087	41,256
12	Vail, CO Urban Cluster	3,370	41,037
13	Park City, UT Urban Cluster	8,574	40,058
14	Summit Park, UT Urban Cluster	5,727	39,758
15	Tellico Village, TN Urban Cluster	2,581	38,712
16	Evergreen, CO Urban Cluster	10,527	38,448
17	Half Moon Bay, CA Urban Cluster	22,037	38,432
18	Concord, CA Urbanized Area	552,624	38,311
19	Bridgeport—Stamford, CT—NY Urbanized Area	888,890	36,977
20	Hightstown, NJ Urbanized Area	69,977	36,963
21	Lake Conroe Westshore, TX Urban Cluster	11,232	36,821
22	Hilton Head Island, SC Urban Cluster	34,400	36,798
23	Pecan Plantation, TX Urban Cluster	4,402	36,782
24	Ketchum, ID Urban Cluster	4,419	35,850
25	Mission Viejo, CA Urbanized Area	533,015	35,605
26	Castle Rock, CO Urban Cluster	25,325	35,522
27	Incline Village-Crystal Bay, NV—CA Urban Cluster	17,107	35,447
28	Lambertville, NJ—PA Urban Cluster	8,565	35,274
29	Thousand Oaks, CA Urbanized Area	210,990	35,021
30	White Rock, NM Urban Cluster	5,487	34,925
31	Avon, CO Urban Cluster	13,065	34,787
32	Eagle Mountain, TX Urban Cluster	4,329	34,626
33	The Woodlands, TX Urbanized Area	89,445	34,083
34	Bonita Springs—Naples, FL Urbanized Area	221,251	33,762
35	Lake Conroe Eastshore, TX Urban Cluster	5,688	33,678
36	Roxborough Park, CO Urban Cluster	4,071	33,452
37	Westport, NC Urban Cluster	5,278	32,855
38	Sag Harbor, NY Urban Cluster	5,074	32,682
39	Los Alamos, NM Urban Cluster	10,743	32,556
40	Eldorado at Santa Fe, NM Urban Cluster	4,002	32,508
41	Livermore, CA Urbanized Area	75,202	32,468
42	San Jose, CA Urbanized Area	1,538,312	32,411
43	Cold Spring, NY Urban Cluster	3,422	32,340
44	Tybee Island, GA Urban Cluster	3,441	32,127
45	Washington, DC—VA—MD Urbanized Area	3,933,920	31,568
46	Kennebunk, ME Urban Cluster	8,576	31,500
47	St. Helena, CA Urban Cluster	6,793	31,406
48	Fountain Hills, AZ Urban Cluster	18,444	31,394
49	Lafayette—Louisville, CO Urbanized Area	60,387	31,201
50	Cypress, TX Urban Cluster	122,803	30,980
51	Yountville, CA Urban Cluster	2,916	30,721
52	Steamboat Springs, CO Urban Cluster	9,970	30,661
53	Estes Park, CO Urban Cluster	6,483	30,631
54	Cambria, CA Urban Cluster	5,746	30,496
55	San Francisco—Oakland, CA Urbanized Area	2,995,769	30,239
56	Pawleys Island, SC Urban Cluster	9,113	30,168
57	Langford, MS Urban Cluster	15,990	30,035
58	Green Valley, AZ Urban Cluster	18,571	29,866
59	Frankenmuth, MI Urban Cluster	4,667	29,856
60	Nantucket, MA Urban Cluster	7,551	29,788
61	York Harbor, ME Urban Cluster	8,086	29,739
62	Breckenridge, CO Urban Cluster	4,377	29,721
63	Richfield town (Washington County), WI Urban Cluster	5,045	29,678
64	Camarillo, CA Urbanized Area	62,798	29,674
65	Ocean View, DE Urban Cluster	7,330	29,549
66	Highland Mills, NY Urban Cluster	7,127	29,423
67	Poolesville, MD Urban Cluster	4,740	29,318
68	Portsmouth, NH—ME Urbanized Area	50,912	29,155
69	Brooklyn, MI Urban Cluster	4,683	29,144
70	Jefferson township (Morris County), NJ Urban Cluster	8,475	29,097
71	Bulverde, TX Urban Cluster	2,915	28,989
72	Lewes, DE Urban Cluster	15,787	28,965
73	Juneau South, AK Urban Cluster	7,909	28,948
74	McKinney, TX Urbanized Area	54,525	28,927
75	Mattituck, NY Urban Cluster	5,932	28,910
76	Lago Vista, TX Urban Cluster	3,580	28,906
77	Boulder, CO Urbanized Area	112,299	28,837
78	Rhinebeck, NY Urban Cluster	3,117	28,797
79	Santa Cruz, CA Urbanized Area	157,348	28,760
80	Germantown Hills, IL Urban Cluster	4,011	28,734
81	Skaneateles, NY Urban Cluster	3,464	28,712
82	Lake Wildwood, CA Urban Cluster	6,527	28,499
83	South Lyon—Howell—Brighton, MI Urbanized Area	106,139	28,472
84	Southern Pines—Pinehurst, NC Urban Cluster	30,653	28,429
85	Danbury, CT—NY Urbanized Area	154,455	28,417
86	Denton—Lewisville, TX Urbanized Area	299,823	28,386
87	Boulder City, NV Urban Cluster	12,059	28,376
88	Lake Goodwin, WA Urban Cluster	5,077	28,193
89	Maumelle, AR Urban Cluster	10,706	28,119
90	New Buffalo, MI Urban Cluster	2,724	28,112
91	Shady Side, MD Urban Cluster	10,018	28,041
92	Boston, MA—NH—RI Urbanized Area	4,032,484	27,922
93	Woodcreek, TX Urban Cluster	2,607	27,903
94	Fernandina Beach, FL Urban Cluster	18,491	27,889
95	Warrenton, VA Urban Cluster	15,135	27,876
96	Sedona, AZ Urban Cluster	7,827	27,865
97	Big Park, AZ Urban Cluster	4,647	27,844
98	Silverthorne, CO Urban Cluster	12,714	27,773
99	Santa Barbara, CA Urbanized Area	196,263	27,712
100	Wilderness, VA Urban Cluster	6,391	27,613

=== Urban areas with at least 100,000 inhabitants ===
Rank	Place	Population	Per Capita Income
1	San Rafael—Novato, CA Urbanized Area	232,836	45,384
2	Concord, CA Urbanized Area	552,624	38,311
3	Bridgeport—Stamford, CT—NY Urbanized Area	888,890	36,977
4	Mission Viejo, CA Urbanized Area	533,015	35,605
5	Thousand Oaks, CA Urbanized Area	210,990	35,021
6	Bonita Springs—Naples, FL Urbanized Area	221,251	33,762
7	San Jose, CA Urbanized Area	1,538,312	32,411
8	Washington, DC—VA—MD Urbanized Area	3,933,920	31,568
9	Cypress, TX Urban Cluster	122,803	30,980
10	San Francisco—Oakland, CA Urbanized Area	2,995,769	30,239
11	Boulder, CO Urbanized Area	112,299	28,837
12	Santa Cruz, CA Urbanized Area	157,348	28,760
13	South Lyon—Howell—Brighton, MI Urbanized Area	106,139	28,472
14	Danbury, CT—NY Urbanized Area	154,455	28,417
15	Denton—Lewisville, TX Urbanized Area	299,823	28,386
16	Boston, MA—NH—RI Urbanized Area	4,032,484	27,922
17	Santa Barbara, CA Urbanized Area	196,263	27,712
18	Raleigh, NC Urbanized Area	541,527	27,600
19	Santa Clarita, CA Urbanized Area	170,481	27,118
20	Charlotte, NC—SC Urbanized Area	758,927	26,896
21	Minneapolis—St. Paul, MN Urbanized Area	2,388,593	26,704
22	Seattle, WA Urbanized Area	2,712,205	26,653
23	Simi Valley, CA Urbanized Area	112,345	26,476
24	Seaside—Monterey—Marina, CA Urbanized Area	125,503	26,474
25	Vero Beach—Sebastian, FL Urbanized Area	120,962	26,439

== Sources ==
- Statistics derived from U.S. Census Bureau data; U.S. Department of Commerce, Bureau of Economic Analysis, Survey of Current Business; and DataQuick Information Systems, a public records database company located in La Jolla, San Diego, CA.
