= Finn Murphy =

American long haul trucker and author

Finn Murphy (born May 22, 1958) is an American long haul trucker and author of The Long Haul: A Trucker's Tales of Life on the Road (2017) and Rocky Mountain High: A Tale of Boom and Bust in the New Wild West (2023), both published by W.W. Norton & Company. He was born in Greenwich, Connecticut as the fifth child of illustrator and cartoonist John Cullen Murphy and Joan Byrne Murphy's eight children.

He attended parochial schools in Connecticut and attended Colby College in Waterville, Maine. He earned his Commercial Truck Driver license in 1980 and spent almost a decade driving for North American Van Lines. In 2008, Murphy went back on the road as a driver and those two periods became the basis for his first novel.

In the years between, he lived on Nantucket Island, Massachusetts and worked as a businessman and community activist. Murphy served in several public service positions on Nantucket notably as Chairman of the Nantucket Board of Selectmen, Police Commissioner, and as Airport Commissioner. As a businessman he and his wife Pamela owned and operated several luxury retail enterprises and represented the cashmere manufacturer Johnstons of Elgin from an office in New York's garment center.

Murphy was married to Pamela (Bembridge) Murphy from 1986 to 2011; the couple had no children. He now lives with his partner Deb. His siblings include Cullen Murphy, Cullene Murphy, Siobhan Grogan, Byrne Sleeper, Brendan Murphy, Cait Murphy, and Mairead Nash.

== Works ==
- The Long Haul: A Trucker's Tales of Life on the Road W. W. Norton & Company; June 2017 (hardback), ISBN 9780393608717, OCLC 959808194
- The Long Haul: A Trucker's Tales of Life on the Road W. W. Norton & Company; June 2018 (paperback) ISBN 978-0393355871
- Rocky Mountain High: A Tale of Boom and Bust in the New Wild West W. W. Norton & Company; June 2023 (hardback), ISBN 978-1-324-00610-7
