= Mianus River Railroad Bridge =

- U.S. National Register of Historic Places
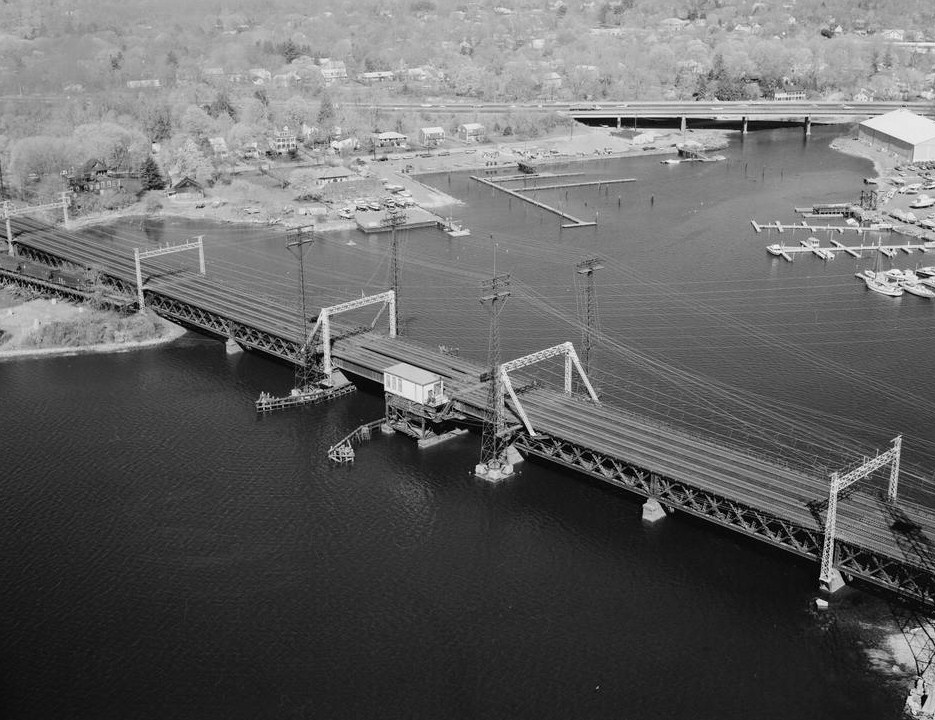
- Mianus River Railroad Bridge in 1977

- Location within Connecticut Location within the United States
- Location: Metro-North Right-of-way at Mianus River, Greenwich, Connecticut
- Coordinates: 41°1′51″N 73°35′41″W
- Area: 1 acre (0.40 ha)
- Built: 1904
- Architect: American Bridge Company
- Architectural style: Deck Girder, Bascule
- MPS: Movable Railroad Bridges on the NE Corridor in Connecticut TR
- NRHP reference No.: 87000845
- Added to NRHP: June 12, 1987

The Mianus River Railroad Bridge, also known as the Cos Cob Bridge, is a bascule drawbridge built in 1904 over the Mianus River, in Greenwich, Connecticut. It was listed on the National Register of Historic Places in 1987. The bridge carries the Northeast Corridor, the busiest rail line in the United States, both in terms of ridership and service frequency. It is operated by the Metro-North Railroad, successor to Conrail, Penn Central, and the New York, New Haven and Hartford Railroad, which erected it, and is owned by the Connecticut Department of Transportation.

It is a rolling lift type moveable bridge, and was prefabricated by the American Bridge Company, to replace a previous unsafe bridge on the site. It has a total length of 1,059 feet (323 m), divided into 11 spans. Seven of these are deck truss spans, while the others are deck girder spans, all set on stone abutments. The main movable span is 107 feet (33 m) long; four of the truss spans are 120 feet (37 m) in length.

It is one of eight moveable bridges on the Northeast Corridor through Connecticut surveyed in one multiple property study in 1986. In November 2024, the Connecticut Department of Transportation was awarded a $6.4 million federal grant to "explore options for replacement" of the bridge.

== See also ==
- National Register of Historic Places listings in Greenwich, Connecticut
- List of bridges on the National Register of Historic Places in Connecticut
