= Mianus, Connecticut =

Neighborhood in Greenwich, Connecticut, US

Coordinates: 41°02′38″N 73°35′28″W

Mianus /maɪˈænəs/, formerly Mayamus and Upper Landing, is a neighborhood in the town of Greenwich in the U.S. state of Connecticut. Unlike other Greenwich neighborhoods such as Cos Cob or Old Greenwich, Mianus does not have its own ZIP code or post office. Mianus lies partly in the Cos Cob ZIP code, partly in the Riverside ZIP code area, and partly in the Old Greenwich ZIP code area. It lies at an elevation of 23 feet (7 m) and is home to an elementary school. Mianus was also home to the Mianus Motor Works, a marine-engine manufacturer.

The Veterans Administration and the town of Greenwich, CT developed the village of 40 starter houses—approximately 800 square feet (74.3 sq m) each—after World War II as rental units for returning servicemen and their families. In the 1950s, as many as 90 children lived with their parents in these houses. The nearby Mianus River, Cos Cob harbor and an extensive woods provided the children with an opportunity to live, grow and play in natural habitats rarely found in American public housing projects. Jack T. Scully, who spent the first 18 years of his life here, has written a collection of coming-of-age poems, Mianus Village, celebrating its bygone way of life.

The toponym Mianus is thought to derive from the name of Mayanno, a Native American chieftain.

== Reference in popular culture ==
In an episode of Jackass, the crew drives 5 hours to Mianus, and records a video of double-entendres and puns based on a mispronunciation of Mianus as "my anus".

In November 2003, during an episode of The Ricky Gervais Show on XFM, Mianus was mentioned during a link associated with comical and unfortunate names of places around the world.
