= Greenwich Public Schools =

School district in Connecticut, United States

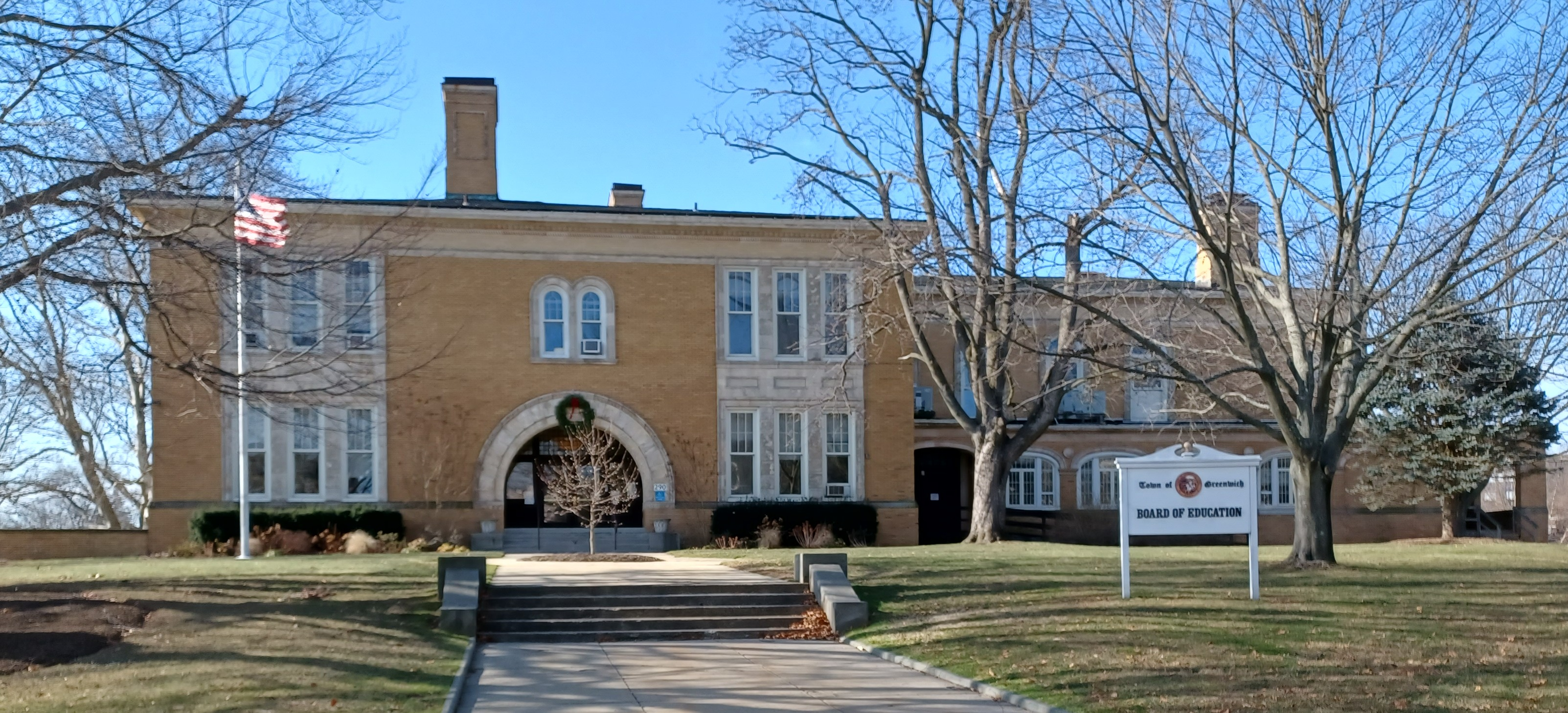

Address
- 290 Greenwich Avenue Greenwich, Connecticut 06830 United States

District information
- Type: Public
- Grades: Pre K-12
- Superintendent: Dr. Toni Jones

Greenwich Public Schools is a school district located in Fairfield County, in Greenwich, Connecticut, United States. The district has boundaries that are coterminous with those of the town. Approximately 8,840 students in grades K–12 attend the Greenwich Public Schools.

As of 2012, elementary schools had the same pattern of racial segregation as the town as a whole, with Hispanic students concentrated in the two elementary schools in the southwestern corner of the district, New Lebanon and Hamilton Avenue. There is a Connecticut racial diversity law which requires that the percentage of students in an ethnic group in a school may not deviate by more than 25% from the average for the district. Thus, as of 2013, the district was out of compliance and was searching for solutions.

== List of schools ==
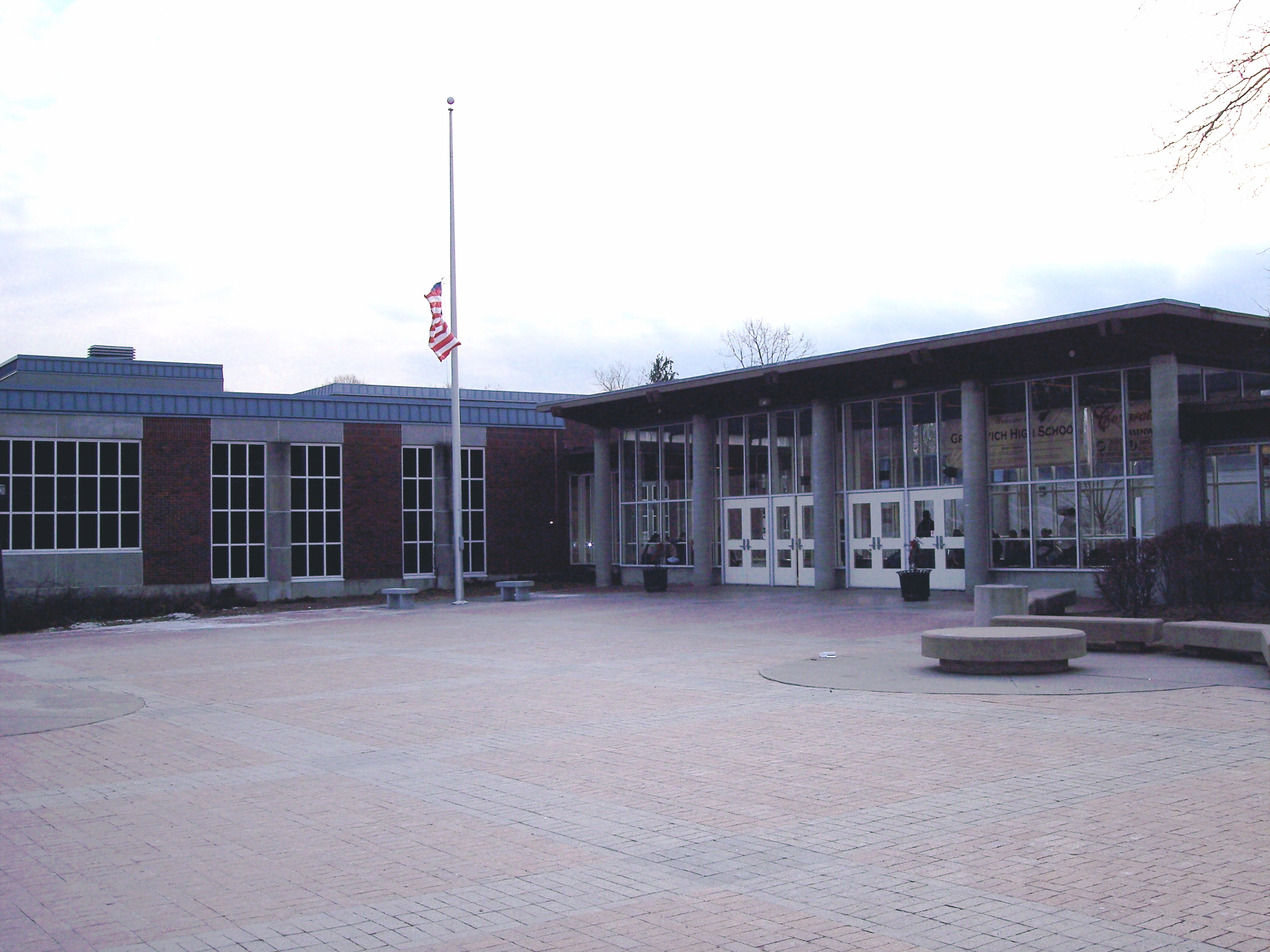
Greenwich High School

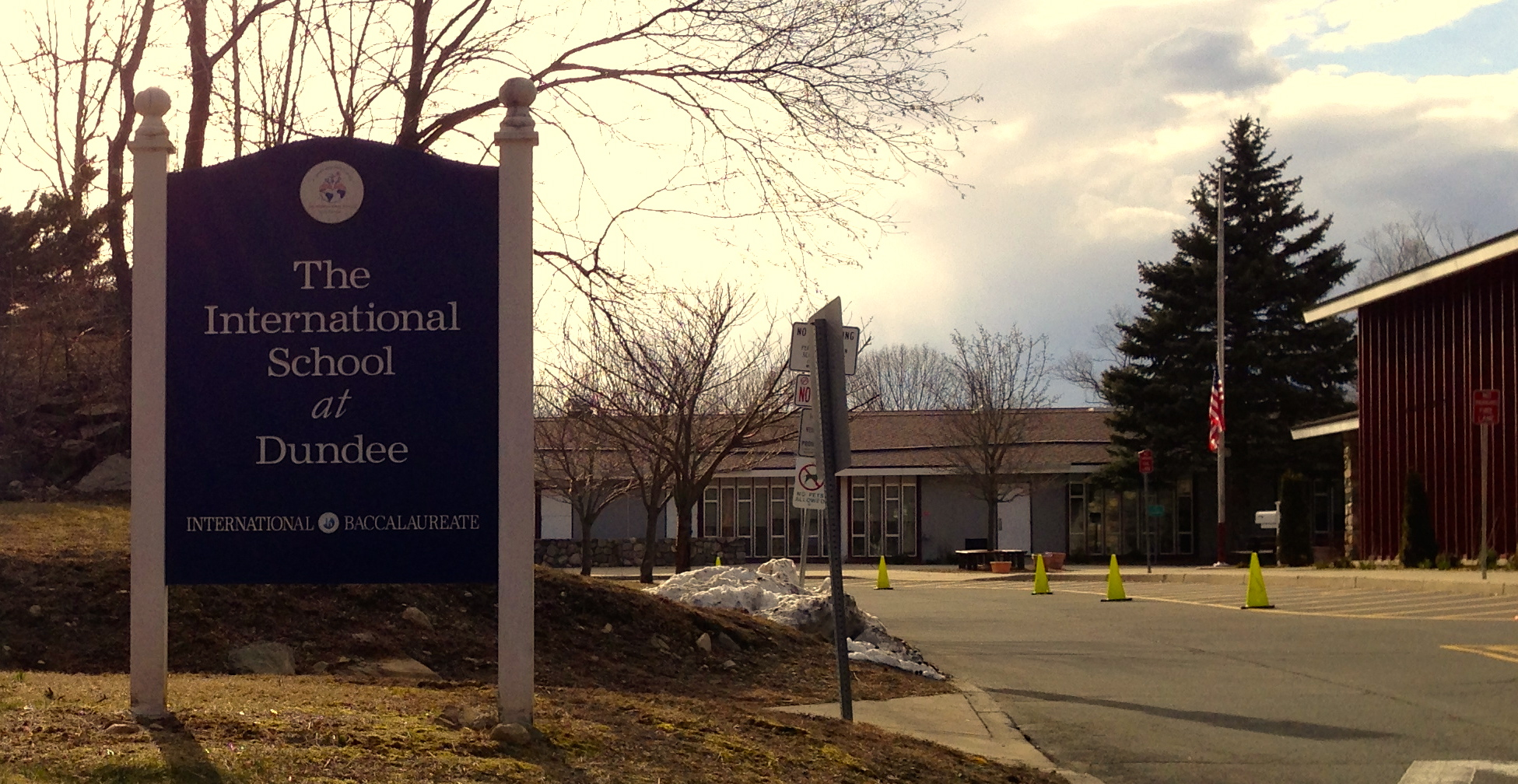
The International School at Dundee

=== High school ===
- Greenwich High School (grades 9-12)

=== Middle schools (grades 6-8) ===
- Central Middle School
- Eastern Middle School
- Western Middle School

=== Elementary schools (grades K-5) ===
- Cos Cob
- Glenville
- Hamilton Avenue
- The International School at Dundee
- Julian Curtis
- New Lebanon
- North Mianus
- North Street
- Old Greenwich
- Parkway
- Riverside
