= History of Greenwich, Connecticut =

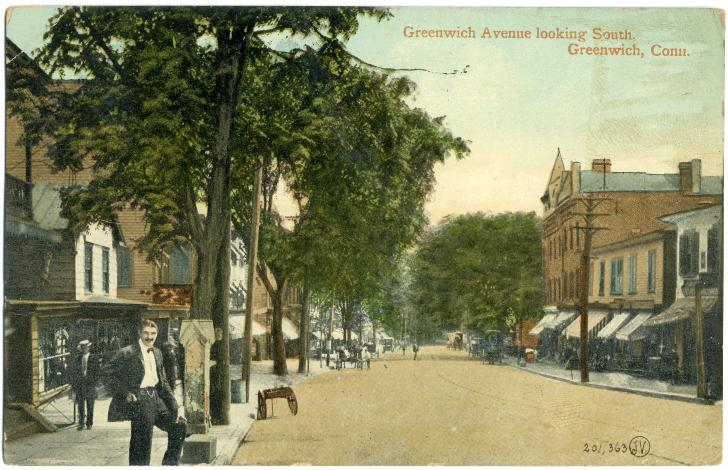
Greenwich Avenue, looking south, from a 1910 postcard

The history of Greenwich, Connecticut, United States.

== Colonial times ==
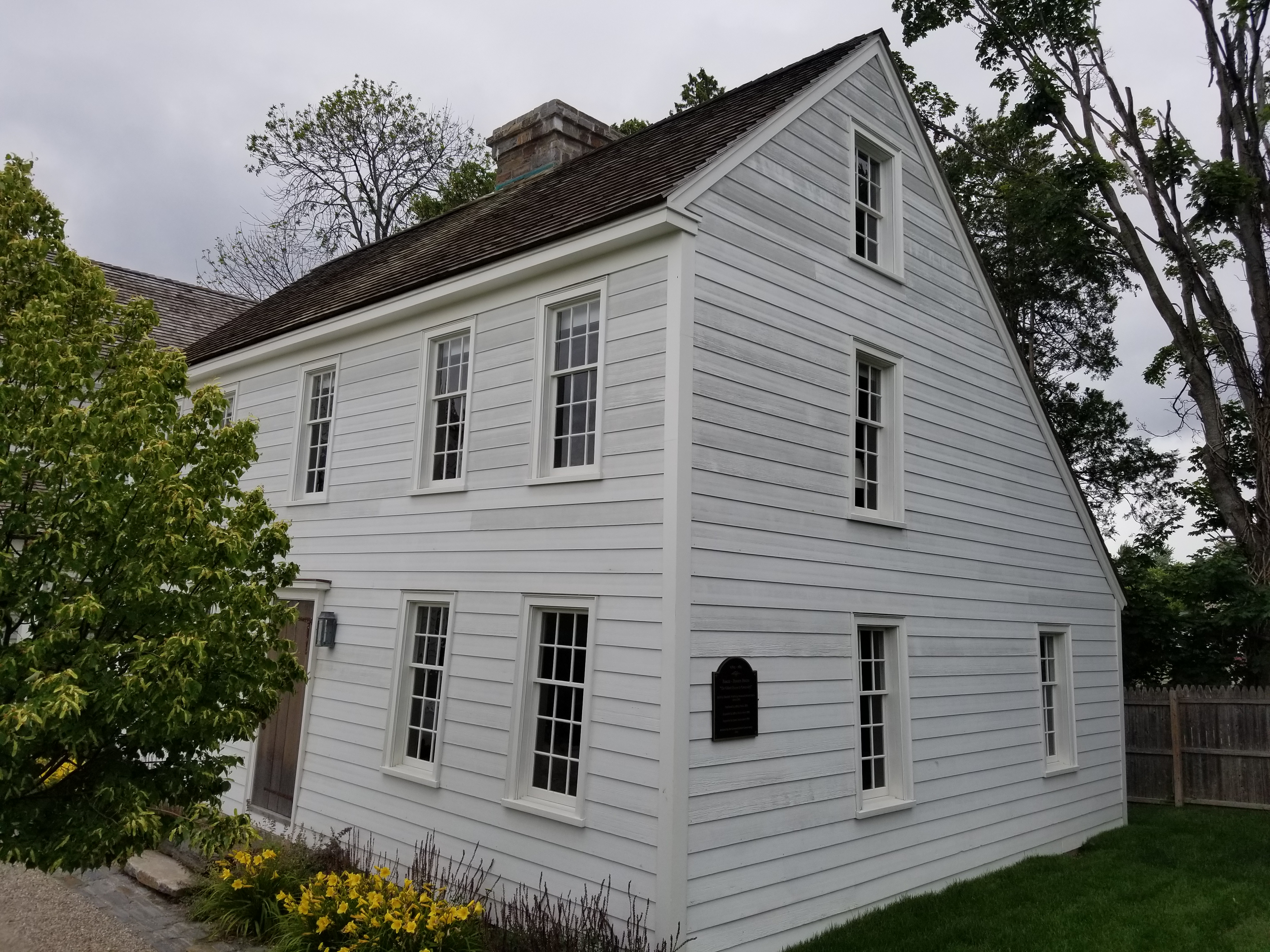
Feake-Ferris House, circa 1645-1689, likely the first and oldest house in Greenwich

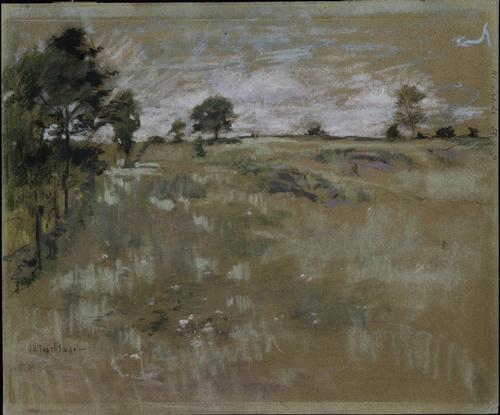
Pastures, Greenwich, Connecticut (about 1890–1900) by artist John Henry Twachtman

On July 18, 1640, Daniel Patrick and Robert Feake, jointly purchased the land between the Asamuck and Tatomuck brooks, in the area now called as Old Greenwich, from Wiechquaesqueek Munsees living there for "twentie-five coates." Modern "Greenwich Point" was natively called Monakeywaygo. Elizabeth Feake renamed it "Elizabeth's Neck," and she constructed the Feake-Ferris House (circa 1645) there, which still exists.

The Dutch, based in Fort Amsterdam on the southern tip of Manhattan sent armed soldiers to the Feakes and Patricks a few weeks after their arrival and forced them to acknowledge that their land lay within Dutch jurisdiction - a territory of the West India Company that was called New Netherland. The Dutch renamed Greenwich "Groenwits," to communicate its Dutch sovereignty, and the town served as the defended eastern border between New Netherland and New England. The small creek flowing through Innis Arden Country Club marks this boundary.

For its first 16 years, Greenwich was Dutch. One of Dutch Director Peter Stuyvesant's first actions was to strengthen his claim to Greenwich to prevent the Thirteen Colonies from establishing themselves closer to New Netherland on Manhattan. He received title to all the land between the west bank of the Mianus River and Stamford's Mill River, (natively called the Seweyruc), and he confiscated the original purchase property in the process. Angry Stamford demanded renegotiation of the border and in 1650, The Treaty of Hartford occurred which weakened Dutch control. In 1656 New Haven Colony assumed control over the town, against the wishes of many residents. After the fall of the New Haven Colony, the Connecticut Colony assumed control in 1664 and the General Assembly in Hartford declared Greenwich a separate township from Stamford.

The first townsmen, the seven proprietors of 1664, who lived only with Old Greenwich on the east side of the Mianus River, planned the development of a second community called Horseneck, the land on the west side of the River. Lands west of the Mianus were natively named Paihomsing. It was not until 1674 that European population began here, delayed by King Philip's War and the Dutch retaking of Manhattan in 1674. The name "Horseneck" was used as late as 1800.

The town's first economy was livestock and leather based and it supplied secondary products such as shows, gloves and meat throughout the region.

== Travel challenges in the 17th and 18th centuries ==
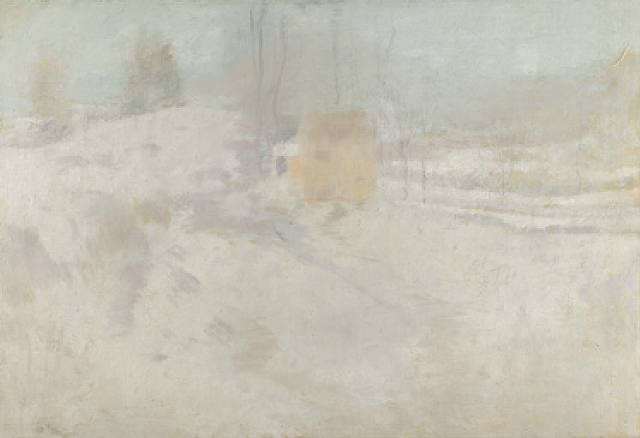
Barn in Winter, Greenwich, Connecticut by John Henry Twachtman

The main route from Boston to New York, called "The Country Road," in the seventeenth and eighteenth centuries, went through Greenwich (later becoming U.S. Route 1), but it was a very rocky, hilly—even precipitous—route until improvements were made in the late eighteenth or early nineteenth century. Many travelers recorded their experiences in diaries or books.

Sarah Knight, 38, journeying by horseback in 1704, remarked on the "mountanos" (sic) incline the road took on the east side of Greenwich, which "broke my heart in ascending." (It was very probably the steep "Putnam Staircase" that features in the account of Israel Putnam's flight during the American Revolution.)

A Scottish physician, Alexander Hamilton (no relation to the more famous founding father), journeyed from Maryland to Maine in 1744, arriving in Norwalk on August 29. That day, the traveler wrote (with his spelling), he "rid 10 miles of stonny road, crossing several brooks and rivulets that run into the Sound, till I came to Stamford. A littel before I reached this town, from the top of a stonny hill, I had a large open view or prospect of the country westward. The greatest part of it seemed as if it were covered with a white crust of stone, for the country here is exceeding rocky, and the roads very rough, rather worse than Stonnington."

On the return trip, Hamilton experienced the relief many travelers wrote about when he got over the New York border onto better roads: "'Farewell, Connecticut,' said I, as I passed along the bridge. 'I have had a surfeit of your ragged money, rough roads and enthusiastick people.'"

In 1750, James Birket, traveling toward New York, wrote that the stretch between Greenwich and Stamford was a "Most Intollerable bad road" (his spelling). In 1786, another traveler, Englishman Robert Hunter Jr., made note of the "steep precipice that General Putnam galloped down when he was surprised by the enemy. One would think to look at it, it must be a certain death. -- The road is made to wind around this precipice so as to avoid (it) entirely. You have an elegant view of the country from the summit of it." In areas where farmers had cut down trees, the views from Connecticut hills were likely much more noticeable than today.

America's Founding Fathers also passed through town on the road. In 1774, the Massachusetts delegation to the First Continental Congress began riding along the route: John Adams, Samuel Adams, Robert Treat Paine and Thomas Cushing all rode together.

George Washington came through the area during the American Revolution and again, as president, in October 1789. Between New York state and Stamford, the Virginia farmer thought the land seemed "strong" with plenty of grass. He also noticed the crops and livestock: plenty of pumpkins and Indian corn visible, droves of beef cattle and a flock of sheep. "The cattle seemed to be of good quality, and their hogs large, but rather long legged." He particularly noted the numerous "fences of stone."

By the late eighteenth century, plans were underway to improve the road between Fairfield and the New York border, "for even travelers from overseas were learning to avoid this part of the road by taking the boat between New Haven and New York," according to Louise H. McLean.

== Revolutionary War: The Battle of Horse Neck ==
During the Revolutionary War, General Israel Putnam made a daring escape from the British on February 26, 1779. Although British forces pillaged the town, Putnam was able to warn Stamford. The general's tricorn hat, with a bullet hole piercing its side, is displayed at "Putnam's cottage", the tavern belonging to Israel Knapp (at 243 East Putnam Avenue), where Putnam stayed the night before his famous ride.

== 19th century ==
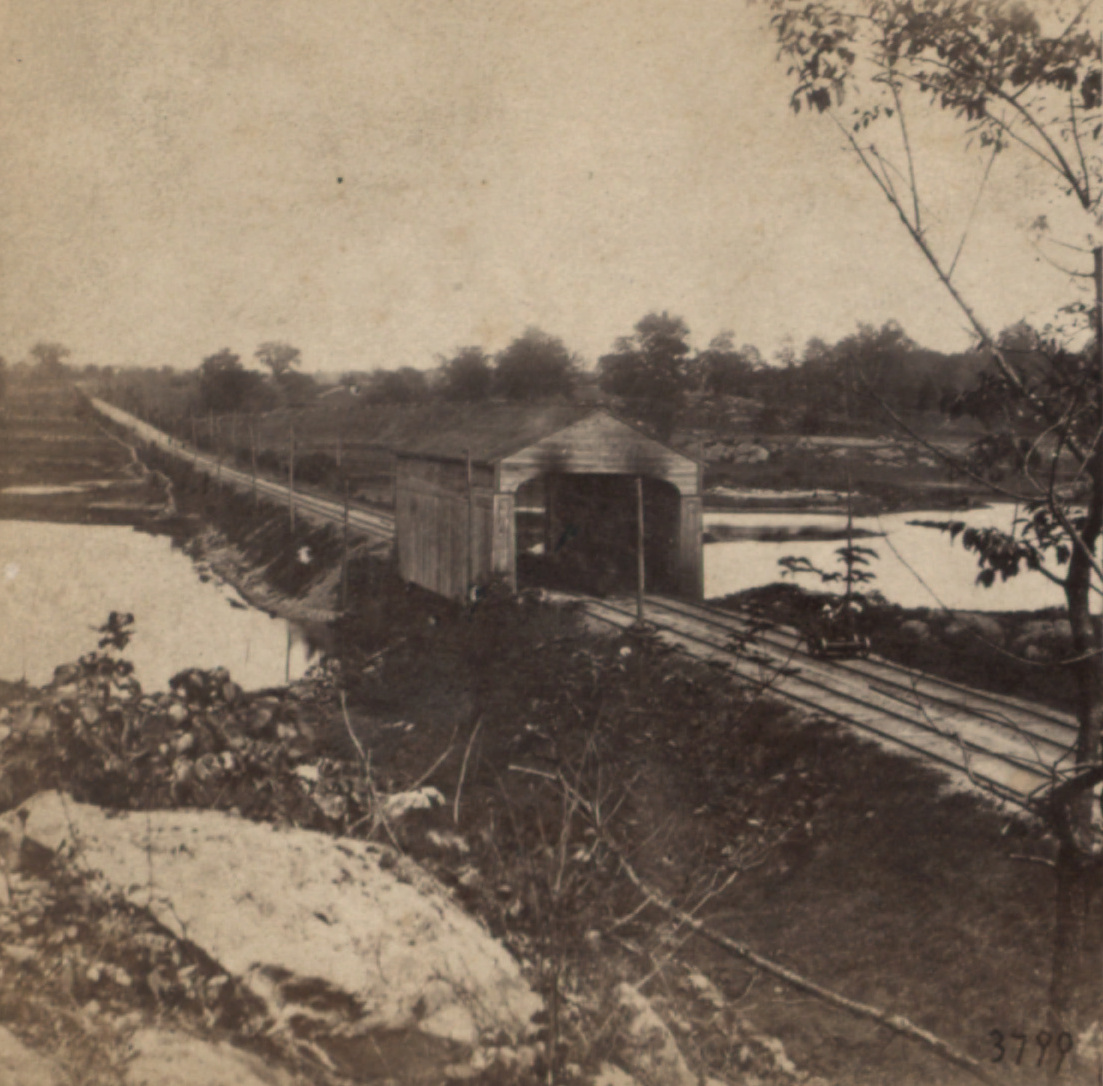
The Nichols Bridge along the New York and New Haven Railroad, ca. 1849

The town grew after the construction of the New York and New Haven Railroad in 1849, linking it to New York City and eventually New Haven and beyond. The Riverside Avenue Bridge is the only wrought iron bridge in the state and one of few such bridges still operating.

=== Art colony ===
Bush-Holley House, a circa 1730 waterfront mansion on the historic Cos Cob Harbor, became a boardinghouse in 1884, primarily serving artists and writers. "Between 1890 and 1920, beginning with classes taught by John Henry Twachtman and Julian Alden Weir for students from New York's Art Students League, the house became the center of the Cos Cob art colony."

Other artists associated with Cos Cob include Leonard Ochtman, Emil Carlsen, Mina Fonda Ochtman, Elmer Livingston MacRae, George Wharton Edwards, Theodore Robinson, and Childe Hassam.

== 20th century ==
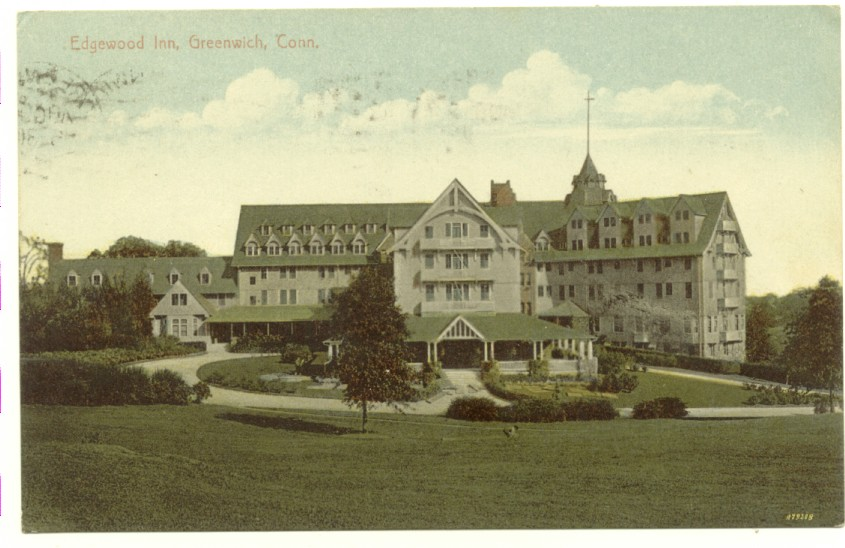
Edgewood Inn, from a 1911 postcard

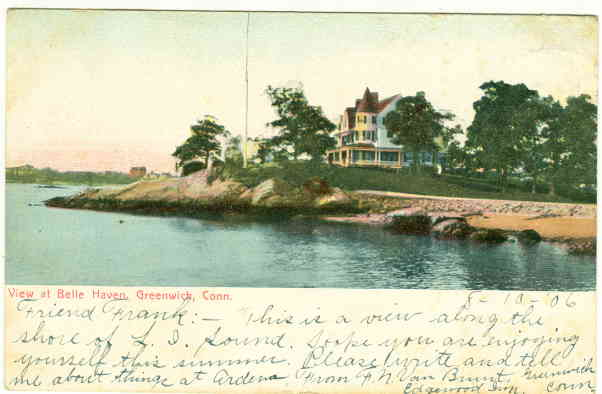
Belle Haven scene, from about 1922

In the late 19th century and early 20th century, the town had a resort industry with more than a dozen inns, including Ye Old Greenwich Inn, The Castle and The Crossways Inn in Old Greenwich, and The Maples Inn, The Lenox House and the Edgewood Inn in the central part of town. The Edgewood Inn, a 150-room hotel on 350 acres (1.4 km^{2}) of former farmland, existed from 1902 to 1940. The 350-foot-long, five-story main building of the inn was constructed by J. T. Weir starting September 28, 1901. Then-modern features included steam heat, electric lights, a telephone in every room and a bath with a porcelain tub shared between every two rooms.

The hotel had a large dining room and two private dining rooms, along with "Ye Colonial Tea Room" and a pink and apple green ballroom. Milk and cream came from the hotel's Jersey cows and ice from the hotel's ice machine. The Edgewood Orchestra played for guests twice a day in an outdoor summerhouse covered in wisteria. For women there was a reception room, parlor and writing room were available. Also in the hotel were a billiard room, barbershop, and a reading and writing room for men. The hotel also had a smoking alcove, card rooms, and a nine-hole golf course, along with tennis courts and a clubhouse known as a "casino" with a bowling alley, a hall for dances, a stage, dressing rooms and a reading room. Individual cottages were also on the property. The Edgewood had 82 straff rooms, and a 22-room building for chauffeurs. The Alfred S. Amer Co. was the original owner and sold the property for $160,000 in 1917. In 1920 the property was again sold, and in 1932 the Beechwood School leased the hotel for 10 years, opening Edgewood Park Junior College. But the school closed in 1940, the hotel's furnishings were sold at auction, and the Barnum Wrecking Co. of Bridgeport razed the building.

=== Late 20th century ===
In 1974, Gulliver's Restaurant and Bar which was astride the border of Greenwich and Port Chester, burned one early morning, killing 24 young people who were at a discothèque there. Peter J. Leonard, a 10th grade drop out from Greenwich was convicted and served about 12 years in New York State for his arson fire that he set trying to cover up a minor burglary at a bowing alley next door.

In 1975, 15-year-old Martha Moxley was murdered in the gated community of Belle Haven in Greenwich. In 2002, a jury in Norwalk found Michael Skakel guilty of the crime. The murder was depicted in 1993 in the book A Season in Purgatory by Dominick Dunne and in Murder in Greenwich in 1998 by Mark Fuhrman which was later made into a movie of the same title.

In 1983, the Mianus River Bridge, which carries traffic on Interstate 95 over an estuary, collapsed, resulting in the death of three people. Highway traffic had to be diverted onto local streets. Later investigations revealed that two of the pin-and-hanger assemblies holding the support beams had failed. The safety of similarly constructed bridges such as the Harvard Bridge was brought into question and investigated.

== 21st century ==
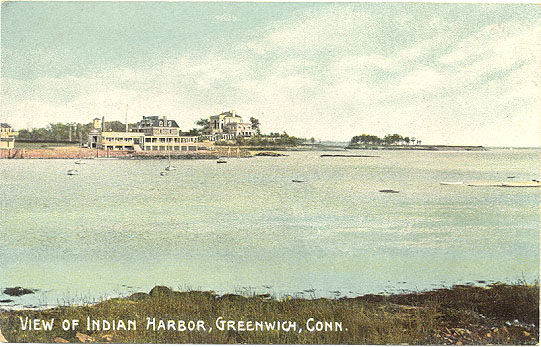
Postcard: Indian Harbor, circa 1907-1915

Originally, Greenwich Point (locally termed "Tod's Point"), which is on a peninsula and includes picnic areas, a beach and small marina, was open only to town residents and their guests. However, a lawyer, sued, saying his rights to freedom of assembly were threatened because he was not allowed to go there. The lower courts disagreed, but the Supreme Court of Connecticut agreed, and Greenwich was forced to amend its beach access policy to all four beaches. The man was billed $120 for the visits he had made to the park before the policy was changed. However, he refused to pay, setting off another debate in the town as to whether it was right to charge him. Finally, an anonymous donor left $120 in cash in an envelope at Town Hall to cover the expense.

In the terrorist attacks on September 11, 2001, 12 residents of the town were killed—more than from any other Connecticut community. These town residents were murdered in the massacre that day (except as noted, all were in the World Trade Center): Kevin P. Connors, 55; Ulf Ramm Ericson, 79; Steven Lawrence Glick, 42; Donald F. Greene, 47 (on United Flight 93); James D. Halvorson, 56; Joseph A. Lenihan, 41; Cheryl Ann Monyak, 43; Michel Adrian Pelletier, 36; Michael Craig Rothberg, 39; Frederick T. Varacchi, 35; Martin P. Wohlforth, 47; and Charles A. Zion, 54.

== Greenwich Historical Society ==
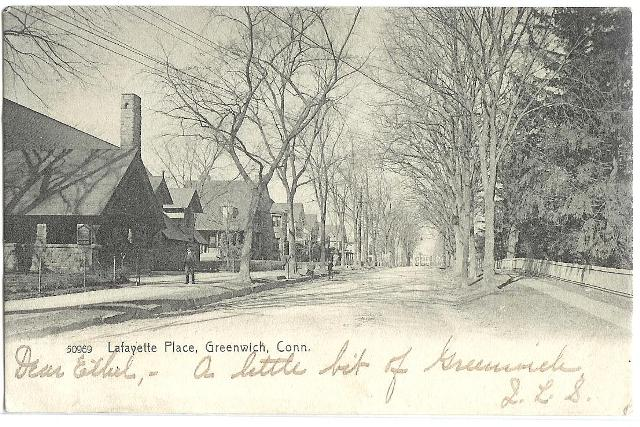
"A little bit of Greenwich" — Lafayette Place, about 1906

Founded in 1931, the historical society purchased Bush-Holley House in 1957, restored it and by 1958 the house opened to the public as a museum. In 1991 Bush-Holley House was granted National Historic Landmark status.

"In 1975 the town's first National Register and Local Historic District, the Strickland Road Historic District, was established through the Historical Society's efforts. The district includes Bush-Holley House and protects over 25 houses built between 1730 and 1938." In 1989, the Justus Luke Bush Storehouse (1805) was purchased.

== National Register of Historic Places ==
- Bush-Holley House — 39 Strickland Rd.
- Byram School — Between Sherman Ave. and Western Junior Hwy.
- Cos Cob Power Station — Roughly bounded by Metro North RR tracks, the Mianus R. and Sound Shore Dr. Demolished in 2001, but the land it stood on technically remains a historic district.
- Cos Cob Railroad Station — 55 Station Dr.
- Fourth Ward Historic District — Roughly along Church, Division, Northfield and William Sts.; and Putnam Court and Sherwood Place
- French Farm — N of Greenwich at jct. of Lake Ave. and Round Hill Rd.
- Glenville School — 449 Pemberwick Rd.
- Great Captain Island Lighthouse — Great Captain Island, SW of Greenwich Pt.
- Greenwich Avenue Historic District — Roughly bounded by Railroad, Arch, Field Point, W. Elm, Greenwich, Putnam, Mason, Havemeyer, and Bruce
- Greenwich Town Hall — 229 Greenwich Ave.
- Greenwich YMCA — 50 E. Putnam Ave.
- Josiah Wilcox House — 354 Riversville Rd.
- Knapp Tavern — 243 E. Putnam Ave.
- Merritt Parkway — CT 15 and right-of-way between the NY state line and the Housatonic R. bridge
- Methodist Episcopal Church — 61 E. Putnam Ave.
- Mianus River Railroad Bridge — AMTRAK Right-of-way at Mianus River
- New Mill and Depot Building, Hawthorne Woolen Mill — 350 Pemberwick Rd.
- Putnam Hill Historic District — U.S. 1
- Riverside Avenue Bridge — Riverside Ave. and RR tracks
- Rosemary Hall — Jct. of Ridgeway and Zaccheus Mead Ln.
- Round Hill Historic District — Roughly, jct. of John St. and Round Hill Rd.
- Samuel Ferris House — E. Putnam and Cary Sts.
- Sound Beach Railroad Station (Now called the Old Greenwich Railroad Station) — 160 Sound Beach Ave.
- Strickland Road Historic District — 19-47 Strickland Rd.
- Sylvanus Selleck Gristmill — 124 Old Mill Rd.
- Thomas Lyon House — W. Putnam Ave. and Byram Rd.
- US Post Office-Greenwich Main — 310 Greenwich Ave.
