= Selleck =

Selleck is a surname. Notable people with the surname include:

- Clyde A. Selleck (1888–1973), United States Army officer
- Eric Selleck (born 1987), Canadian professional ice hockey player
- Francis Palmer Selleck (1895–1976), Australian mayor
- Gold Selleck Silliman (1732–1790), Connecticut militia general
- Roda Selleck (1847–1924), American painter
- Roy Selleck (born 1944), Australian footballer
- Roy Selleck (footballer, born 1909) (1909–1972), Australian footballer
- Silas Selleck (1828–1885), American businessman
- Tom Selleck (born 1945), American actor

== See also ==
- Selleck, Washington
- Sylvanus Selleck Gristmill, historical building in Connecticut
