= Bartow S. Weeks =

American judge

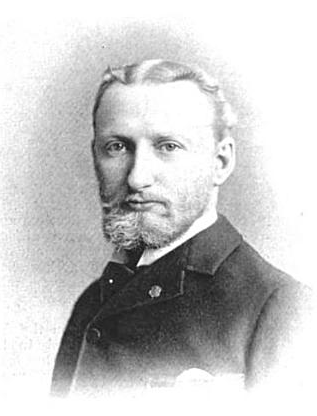
Bartow S. Weeks

Bartow Sumter Weeks (April 25, 1861 – February 3, 1922) was an American judge who was the President of the New York Athletic Club, President of the Amateur Athletic Union and a justice of the New York Supreme Court.

== Biography ==
He was born on April 25, 1861, in Round Hill, Connecticut. He died on February 3, 1922, in Miami Beach, Florida. He was buried at Woodlawn Cemetery in The Bronx.
