= Greenwich Town Hall =

Greenwich Town Hall may refer to:

- Greenwich Town Hall (Connecticut), USA
- Greenwich Town Hall, London, UK
