= Methodist Episcopal Church (Greenwich, Connecticut) =

Historic church in Connecticut, United States

- U.S. National Register of Historic Places
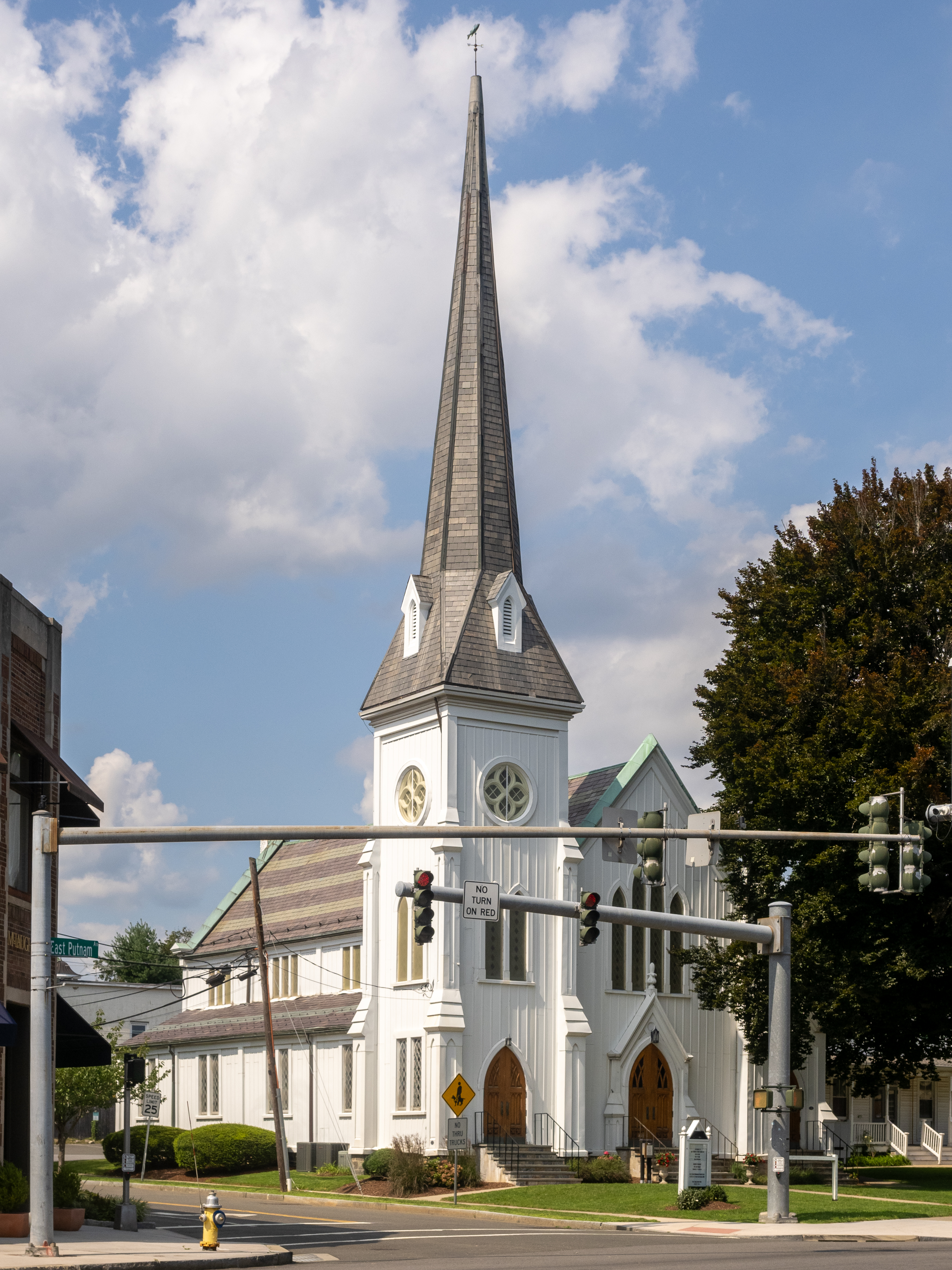
- (2024)

- Location within Connecticut Location within the United States
- Location: 61 East Putnam Avenue, Greenwich, Connecticut
- Coordinates: 41°1′58″N 73°37′35″W
- Area: 0.8 acres (0.32 ha)
- Built: 1868
- Built by: Ferris & McClure
- Architectural style: Italianate, Gothic Revival, Carpenter Gothic
- NRHP reference No.: 88001343
- Added to NRHP: August 25, 1988

The Methodist Episcopal Church is a historic church and parsonage at 61 East Putnam Avenue (U.S. Route 1) in Greenwich, Connecticut. Built in 1868-69 for a Methodist congregation established in 1805, the church is a fine local example of Carpenter Gothic architecture, and the parsonage, built in 1872, is a good example of Italianate architecture. The property was listed on the National Register of Historic Places in 1988. The congregation is affiliated with the United Methodist Church.

== Description and history ==
Greenwich's First Methodist Episcopal is located at the northern end of Greenwich's central business district, on the north side of East Putnam Avenue at Church Street. The church building is a single-story Carpenter Gothic structure, built in 1868-69 for a Methodist congregation established in 1805. The adjacent parsonage, now a community center, is a vernacular Italianate house built in 1872, and has a large modern two-story brick addition at the rear. The church was designed to resemble an English Gothic country church, but now occupies a site surrounded by commercial development.

Greenwich was first exposed to Methodist preaching in 1787, when Samuel Q. Talbot began to circuit ride throughout southwestern Fairfield County. The Greenwich Episcopal society was organized in 1805, and its first church was built on this property in 1844, on the location now occupied by the parsonage. The present church was built in 1868-69, and the original church was replaced by the parsonage in 1872. The property originally included a row of horse sheds; these were demolished in 1923. The congregation sought to execute a major update of the building in the 1920s, which failed due to an inability to raise the needed funding; the money that was raised was used to replace the slate roof and add copper gutters.

== See also ==
- National Register of Historic Places listings in Greenwich, Connecticut
