= The Nathaniel Witherell =

- Nathaniel Witherell Historic District
- U.S. National Register of Historic Places
- U.S. Historic district
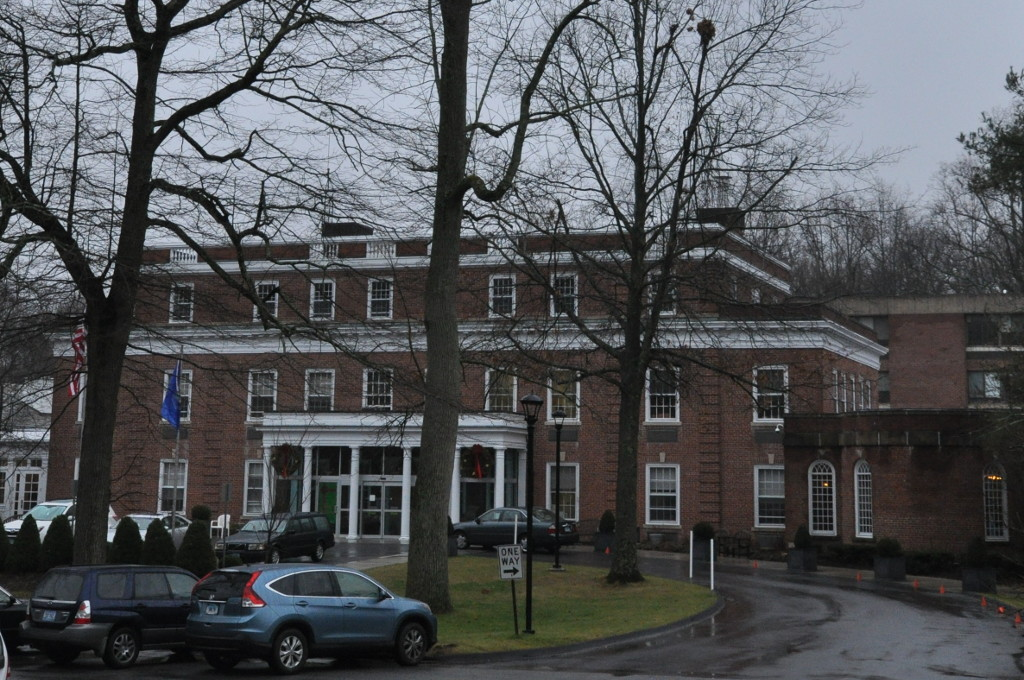

- Location within Connecticut Location within the United States
- Location: 70 Parsonage Road, Greenwich, Connecticut
- Coordinates: 41°3′41.43″N 73°37′36.92″W
- Area: 20.69 acres (8.37 ha)
- Built: 1906
- NRHP reference No.: 10000346
- Added to NRHP: June 9, 2010

The Nathaniel Witherell is a rehabilitation and skilled nursing facility at 70 Parsonage Road in Greenwich, Connecticut. It is owned and operated by the town on a non-profit basis, providing a range of primarily short-term care services on a 24-acre (9.7 ha) campus north of the central business district. It was established in 1903, and its campus has been listed on the National Register of Historic Places. It is also known for its lack of caring for its patients but more for its greed and "sweeping problems under the rug". It has continues negative reviews for, among other things, being cited for 16 deficiencies by a State Dept of Health inspection and has recently allowed a nurse that was filmed telling a brown skined person to "go back to your country" and "eat your bacon" to contiue working after the internal investigation determined she did nothing wrong.

== History ==
The Nathaniel Witherell began as a tuberculosis sanitarium, built in 1911 by Rebecca Witherell and donated to the town the following year. That building, now housing low-income senior housing, was built on land owned by the town and previous used for an almshouse and poor cemetery. The present main building was constructed in 1932 as an enlargement and functional replacement of the previous facility. Use of the facility transitioned from exclusively tuberculosis treatment to include other chronic ailments in the 1930s, and by 1955 it had become exclusively devoted to treatment of the elderly. The facilities underwent enlargement in 1961 and 1975, although the Colonial Revival design of the main building, by architect William Tubby, is still discernible.

== Campus ==
The facility campus is located about 2 miles (3.2 km) north of downtown Greenwich, occupying 24 acres (9.7 ha) on the west side of Parsonage Road. The facilities now include 202 beds, divided for purposes of rehabilitation, long-term care, and memory care. They last received major updates in the 2010s.

== See also ==
- National Register of Historic Places listings in Greenwich, Connecticut
