= National Register of Historic Places listings in Greenwich, Connecticut =

This is a list of the National Register of Historic Places listings in Greenwich, Connecticut.

This is intended to be a complete list of the properties and districts on the National Register of Historic Places in Greenwich. The locations of National Register properties and districts for which the latitude and longitude coordinates are included below, may be seen in an online map.

There are 295 properties and districts listed on the National Register in Fairfield County. This list covers the 35 properties located partially or entirely in Greenwich. Ones in Bridgeport or Stamford are covered in National Register of Historic Places listings in Bridgeport, Connecticut, or in National Register of Historic Places listings in Stamford, Connecticut. The remainder are covered in National Register of Historic Places listings in Fairfield County, Connecticut.

== Current listings ==
| | Name on the Register | Image | Date listed | Location | Description |
|---|---|---|---|---|---|
| 1 | Bush-Holley House | Bush-Holley House | December 1, 1988 (#88002694) | 39 Strickland Road, in Cos Cob; 41°02′02″N 73°35′52″W | Home of Cos Cob Art Colony, c.1890-1920. Current headquarters and museum of the Greenwich Historical Society. |
| 2 | Byram School | Byram School | August 2, 1990 (#90001110) | Between Sherman Avenue and Western Junior Highway, in Byram; 41°00′46″N 73°39′13″W | "Exceptional" for its architecture. |
| 3 | Cos Cob Power Station | Cos Cob Power Station | August 2, 1990 (#90001096) | Roughly bounded by Metro North Railroad Tracks, the Mianus River, and Sound Shore Drive; 41°01′46″N 73°35′50″W | Significant for its role in the first mainline railroad electrification in the United States. It was the largest component in an enormous scale experiment to implement AC power in railroad power, part of complying with a 1903 New York State law prohibiting steam locomotives in New York City. The building was demolished in 2001, but is still listed. |
| 4 | Cos Cob Railroad Station | Cos Cob Railroad Station | July 28, 1989 (#89000928) | 55 Station Drive; 41°01′47″N 73°36′02″W | A working train station |
| 5 | Samuel Ferris House | Samuel Ferris House | August 10, 1989 (#89001086) | 1 Cary Street, in Riverside; 41°02′32″N 73°35′19″W | |
| 6 | Fourth Ward Historic District | Fourth Ward Historic District | April 21, 2000 (#00000324) | Roughly along Church, Division, Northfield and William Streets; and Putnam Court and Sherwood Place in Downtown Greenwich; 41°02′06″N 73°37′40″W | |
| 7 | French Farm | French Farm | April 3, 1975 (#75001918) | North of Downtown Greenwich at the Junction of Lake Avenue and Round Hill Road; 41°03′07″N 73°38′24″W | |
| 8 | Glenville Historic District | Glenville Historic District | March 9, 2007 (#07000107) | Roughly along Glen Ridge Road, Glenville Road, Glenville Street, Pemberwick Road, Riversville Road, and Weaver Street; 41°02′17″N 73°39′53″W | |
| 9 | Glenville School | Glenville School | November 21, 2003 (#03001169) | 449 Pemberwick Road, in the Glenville Historic District; 41°02′12″N 73°39′52″W | 1921 school by James O. Betelle is only T-shaped Georgian Revival school in Greenwich. Now West Greenwich Civic Center. |
| 10 | Great Captain Island Lighthouse | Great Captain Island Lighthouse | April 3, 1991 (#91000351) | Great Captain Island, southwest of Greenwich Point; 40°58′57″N 73°37′26″W | |
| 11 | Greenwich Avenue Historic District | Greenwich Avenue Historic District | August 31, 1989 (#89001215) | Roughly bounded by Railroad, Arch, Field Point, West Elm, Greenwich, Putnam, Mason, Havemeyer, and Bruce, in Downtown Greenwich; 41°01′33″N 73°37′36″W | |
| 12 | Greenwich Municipal Center Historic District | Greenwich Municipal Center Historic District | July 26, 1988 (#88000579) | 101 Field Point Road, 290, 299, 310 Greenwich Avenue, in Downtown Greenwich; 41°01′29″N 73°37′37″W | |
| 13 | Greenwich Point Historic District | Greenwich Point Historic District | July 12, 2021 (#100004671) | Tod's Driftway at Shore Road; 41°00′17″N 73°34′45″W | |
| 14 | Greenwich Town Hall | Greenwich Town Hall | May 21, 1987 (#87000807) | 299 Greenwich Avenue, in Downtown Greenwich; 41°01′30″N 73°37′32″W | |
| 15 | Greenwich YMCA | Greenwich YMCA | November 7, 1996 (#83004541) | 50 East Putnam Avenue, in Downtown Greenwich; 41°01′55″N 73°37′32″W | |
| 16 | Indian Harbor Yacht Club | Indian Harbor Yacht Club | July 22, 2010 (#10000494) | 710 Steamboat Road; 41°00′42″N 73°37′22″W | |
| 17 | Knapp Tavern | Knapp Tavern | September 15, 1977 (#77001389) | 243 East Putnam Avenue; 41°02′13″N 73°37′10″W | |
| 18 | Little Bethel African Methodist Episcopal Church | Little Bethel African Methodist Episcopal Church | October 12, 2010 (#10000831) | 44 Lake Avenue; 41°01′58″N 73°37′51″W | |
| 19 | Thomas Lyon House | Thomas Lyon House | August 24, 1977 (#77001390) | West Putnam Avenue and Byram Road; 41°00′52″N 73°39′16″W | |
| 20 | Merritt Parkway | Merritt Parkway | April 17, 1991 (#91000410) | Route 15 right-of-way between the New York state line and the Sikorsky Memorial Bridge; 41°05′26″N 73°39′30″W | Historic parkway; also located in Stamford, New Canaan, Norwalk, Westport, Fairfield, Trumbull, and Stratford |
| 21 | Methodist Episcopal Church | Methodist Episcopal Church | August 25, 1988 (#88001343) | 61 East Putnam Avenue; 41°01′58″N 73°37′35″W | |
| 22 | Mianus River Railroad Bridge | Mianus River Railroad Bridge | June 12, 1987 (#87000845) | Metro-North New Haven Line right-of-way at the Mianus River; 41°01′51″N 73°35′41″W | |
| 23 | Nathaniel Witherell Historic District | Nathaniel Witherell Historic District | June 9, 2010 (#10000346) | 70 Parsonage Road; 41°03′41″N 73°37′37″W | |
| 24 | New Mill and Depot Building, Hawthorne Woolen Mill | New Mill and Depot Building, Hawthorne Woolen Mill | February 23, 1990 (#90000152) | 350 Pemberwick Road, in Glenville; 41°02′13″N 73°40′00″W | 1875 mill and depot (accompanying railroad was never built) show unusually high style for functional buildings of that era. Now a retail/office complex. |
| 25 | Putnam Hill Historic District | Putnam Hill Historic District | August 24, 1979 (#79002657) | U.S. Route 1 between Maple Avenue and Old Church Road; 41°02′11″N 73°37′09″W | |
| 26 | River Road-Mead Avenue Historic District | River Road-Mead Avenue Historic District | April 28, 2014 (#14000171) | Roughly along Mead Avenue & River Road; 41°02′15″N 73°35′45″W | |
| 27 | Riverside Avenue Bridge | Riverside Avenue Bridge | August 29, 1977 (#77001391) | Riverside Avenue and Metro-North New Haven Line Railroad Tracks; 41°01′54″N 73°35′18″W | |
| 28 | Rosemary Hall | Rosemary Hall | August 28, 1998 (#90001137) | Junction of Ridgeway and Zaccheus Mead Lane in the Rockridge neighborhood 41°02′15″N 73°38′12″W | Former campus of Rosemary Hall School, now Carmel Academy and The Japanese School of New York. |
| 29 | Round Hill Historic District | Round Hill Historic District | July 25, 1996 (#96000779) | Roughly the junction of John Street and Round Hill Road, in the Back Country of Greenwich; 41°06′17″N 73°40′06″W | |
| 30 | Sylvanus Selleck Gristmill | Sylvanus Selleck Gristmill | August 2, 1990 (#90001109) | 124 Old Mill Road in Northern Greenwich; 41°05′31″N 73°39′33″W | A 1796 gristmill. |
| 31 | Sound Beach Railroad Station | Sound Beach Railroad Station | July 28, 1989 (#89000929) | 160 Sound Beach Avenue, in Old Greenwich; 41°02′00″N 73°34′05″W | A working railroad station in the Old Greenwich (formerly called "Sound Beach") section of Greenwich |
| 32 | Strickland Road Historic District | Strickland Road Historic District | March 22, 1990 (#77001625) | 19-47 Strickland Road in Cos Cob; 41°02′06″N 73°36′03″W | |
| 33 | US Post Office-Greenwich Main | US Post Office-Greenwich Main | January 16, 1986 (#86000077) | 310 Greenwich Avenue, in Downtown Greenwich; 41°01′26″N 73°37′33″W | |
| 34 | William E. Ward House | William E. Ward House | November 7, 1976 (#76001294) | Comly Avenue in Glenville; 41°01′34″N 73°40′03″W | First reinforced concrete structure in U.S., built in the 1870s on state line, and extending into Rye Brook, New York |
| 35 | Josiah Wilcox House | Josiah Wilcox House | November 30, 1988 (#88001344) | 354 Riversville Road in the Riversville neighborhood 41°03′51″N 73°40′32″W | |

== See also ==
- National Register of Historic Places listings in Fairfield County, Connecticut
- National Register of Historic Places listings in Stamford, Connecticut
- National Register of Historic Places listings in Bridgeport, Connecticut
- List of National Historic Landmarks in Connecticut
