= Greenwich Avenue Historic District =

Historic district in Connecticut, United States

- U.S. National Register of Historic Places
- U.S. Historic district
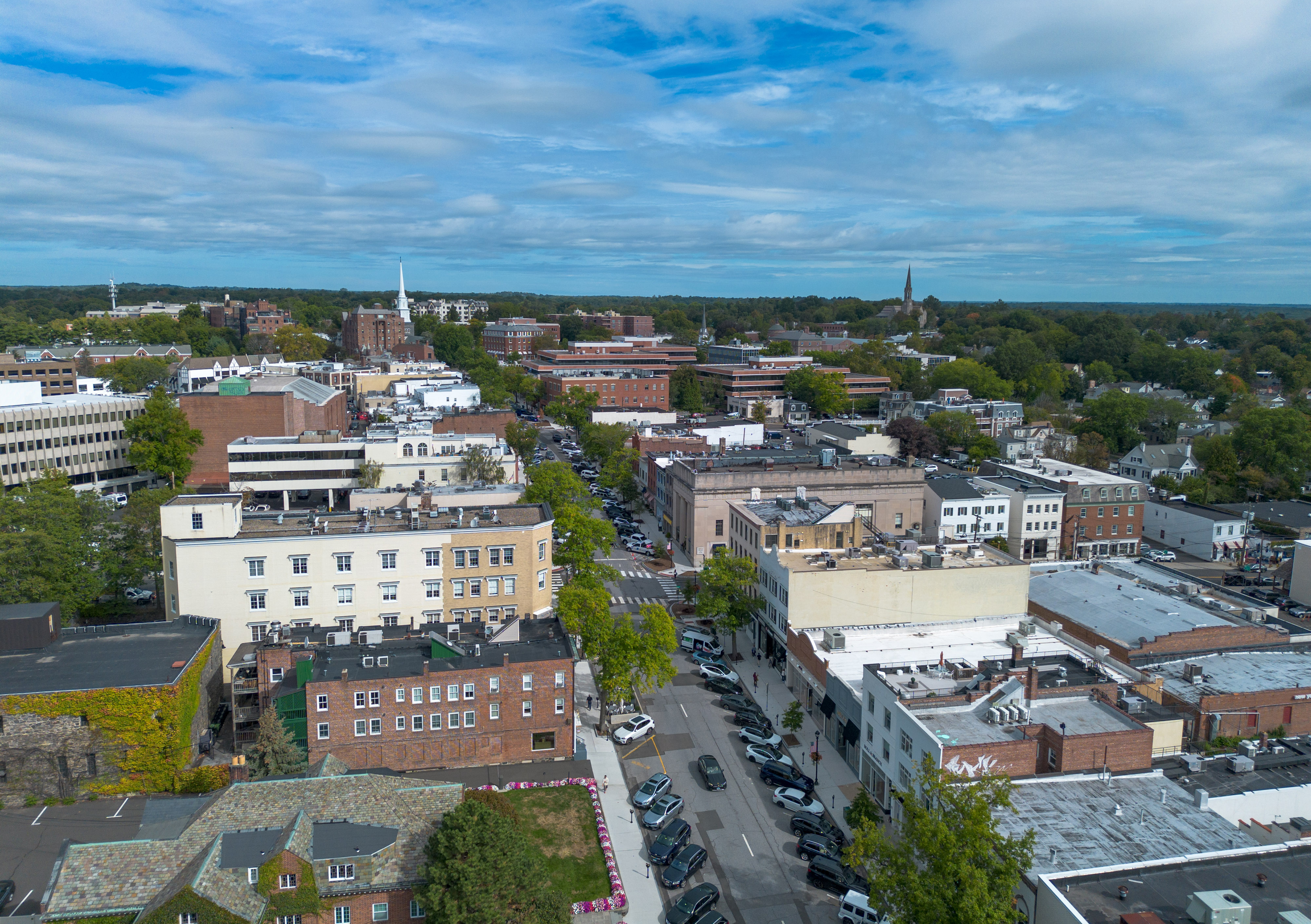
- Greenwich Avenue in 2025

- Location within Connecticut Location within the United States
- Location: Downtown Greenwich, Greenwich, Connecticut
- Coordinates: 41°1′33″N 73°37′36″W
- Area: 86 acres (35 ha)
- Architect: Multiple
- Architectural style: Late 19th And Early 20th Century American Movements, Late 19th And 20th Century Revivals, Late Victorian
- NRHP reference No.: 89001215
- Added to NRHP: August 31, 1989

- Greenwich Municipal Center Historic District
- U.S. National Register of Historic Places
- U.S. Historic district
- U.S. Historic district – Contributing property
- Area: 21.6 acres (8.7 ha)
- Built: 1892
- Architect: Multiple
- Architectural style: Late 19th and 20th Century Revivals, Art Deco, Romanesque
- Part of: Greenwich Avenue Historic District (ID89001215)
- NRHP reference No.: 88000579
- Added to NRHP: July 26, 1988

The Greenwich Avenue Historic District is a historic district representing the commercial and civic historical development of the downtown area of the town of Greenwich, Connecticut. The district was listed on the National Register of Historic Places on August 31, 1989. Included in the district is the Greenwich Municipal Center Historic District, which was listed on the National Register the year before for the classical revival style municipal buildings in the core of Downtown. Most of the commercial buildings in the district fall into three broad styles, reflecting the period in which they were built: Italianate (late 19th century), Georgian Revival (early 20th century), and Commercial style (after World War I). The district is linear and runs north–south along the entire length of Greenwich Avenue, the main thoroughfare of Downtown Greenwich, between U.S. Route 1 and the New Haven Line railroad tracks.

== History ==
The town of Greenwich was first settled in 1640, but settlement was scattered among several villages. It was not until 1665 that Greenwich was formally incorporated as a town of Connecticut. In 1672, a group of settlers bought a tract of land known as Miossehasseky. The area occupied by Havemeyer Fields was used by these settlers as a pasture for horses and the entire village soon acquired the name Horseneck. In 1703, the town voted to have town meetings split between Sound Beach (the oldest settlement) and Horseneck, which was centrally located in the town. In 1760, a “Town House” for conducting town meetings was constructed at what is now the intersection of Putnam and Maple Avenue. The population of Horseneck boomed in the mid-19th century, transforming from a farming village to a wealth suburban community of New York City, mainly as a result of the establishment by the New Haven Railroad of a station at the lower part of Greenwich Avenue. This rapid growth prompted the incorporation of Horseneck as the Borough of Greenwich in 1854. The establishment of borough government ultimately allowed for the rapid construction of new public buildings after the Civil War on previously vacant farmland. Around the area of public buildings, intensive development of commercial as well as residential areas was also taking place.

The rapid development of public buildings in the borough was aided by the development of railroad and steamboat service, allowing people to work in New York City while living in Greenwich. Several wealth New York capitalists spurred the rapid development with their own funds. Henry O. Havemeyer was the first of these benefactors. He donated the money to construct the Havemeyer Building, which was originally a school, in 1892. Another philanthropist, Robert M. Bruce, and his sister Sarah E. Bruce, donated to the town the Old Town Hall (now the Senior Center) after it was constructed in 1905. The core of Downtown Greenwich was completed when the Havemeyer family donated the parcel of land south of the intersection of Arch Street and Greenwich Avenue for construction of a public park and a post office. The post office building was constructed in 1916.

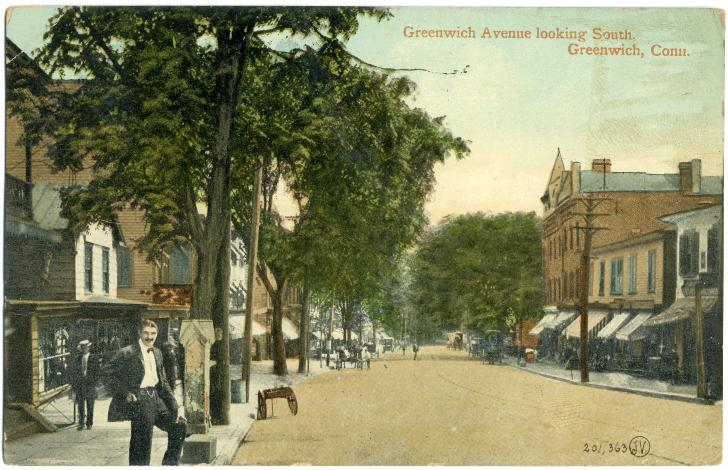
Greenwich Avenue, circa 1910

In the 19th century, most commercial development took place along the northern end of Greenwich Avenue, where the Boston Post Road was located. This area of Greenwich Avenue provided goods and services to the growing residential community around the intersection of Greenwich Avenue and Putnam Avenue, including what is now the Fourth Ward. Sidewalks, kerosene street lighting, and sewer and water lines were in place by 1882. In the early 20th-century, Greenwich Avenue was paved and a streetcar line was established. Many houses that were already on Greenwich Avenue were moved to residential areas on the parallel side streets to make way for commercial blocks. Commercial development continued to boom in the 1920s, helped in part by the electrification and four-tracking of the New Haven Railroad line. The borough had dominated the civic life of the entire town of Greenwich by this time and the borough and town governments were eventually consolidated in 1932 resulting in the modern town government of Greenwich. The last open lot on Greenwich Avenue was built on in 1947 with the construction of an office building now occupied by Fawcett Publications. While upscale retail businesses replaced the earlier stores and office space in existing buildings upgraded, the streetscape of the area is largely intact and continues to function as the commercial and civic center of the town.

== Geography ==
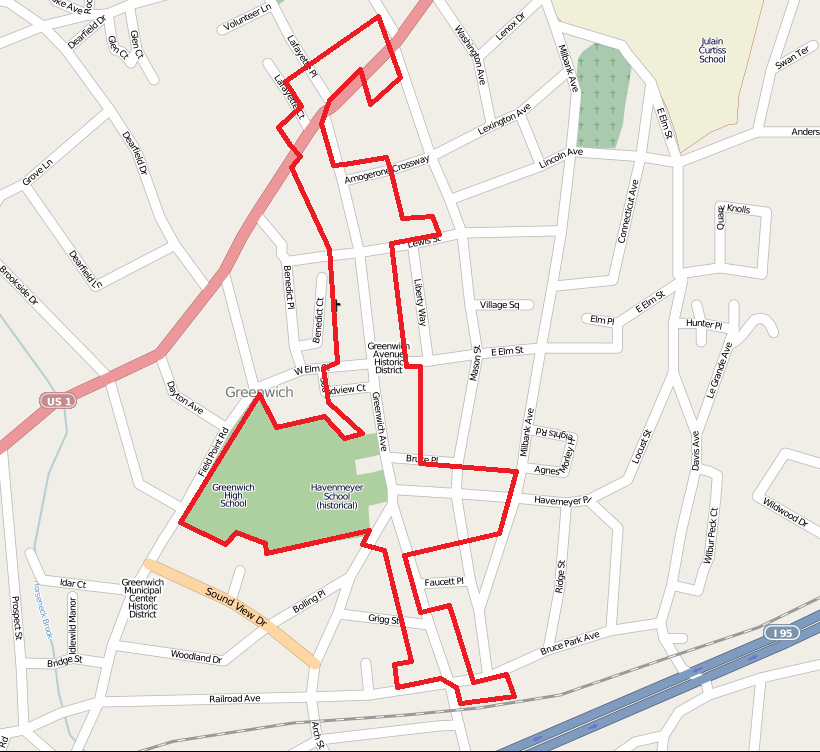
Map of historic district

The district is primarily linear including properties on both sides of Greenwich Avenue from Putnam Avenue (U.S. Route 1) in the north to the New Haven Line tracks in the south. The district has an east–west bulge near its center where the Greenwich Municipal Center district is located. The bulge extends east along both sides of Havemeyer Place up to Millbank Street, and west across Havemeyer Field to Field Point Road, where the current Town Hall is located. The district is also drawn to include commercial blocks off Greenwich Avenue along the north side of Putnam Avenue, the north side of Lewis Street, the south side of Bruce Park, and the north side of Railroad Avenue. There are two specific exclusions along Greenwich Avenue that contain modern buildings. The first is half a block on the east side just south of Putnam Avenue. The second is the east side of the intersection with Fawcett Place. The north, east, and west sides of the district are flanked by residential neighborhoods. Part of the north residential area is included in the Fourth Ward Historic District. In the south are the railroad tracks of the New Haven Line, the Connecticut Turnpike, and Greenwich Harbor.

The historic district covers a total area of 86 acres. Of this area, 21.6 acres are part of the Municipal Center district, with 16.8 acres of that occupied by Havemeyer Field. There are 152 buildings in the district, of which 124 are listed as contributing to the historic and architectural significance of the area. The district is bounded to include historic commercial and civic buildings that are associated to the rapid development of the borough of Greenwich in the period 1860 to 1940, and to exclude primarily residential areas as well as modern commercial construction.

== Significant contributing buildings ==
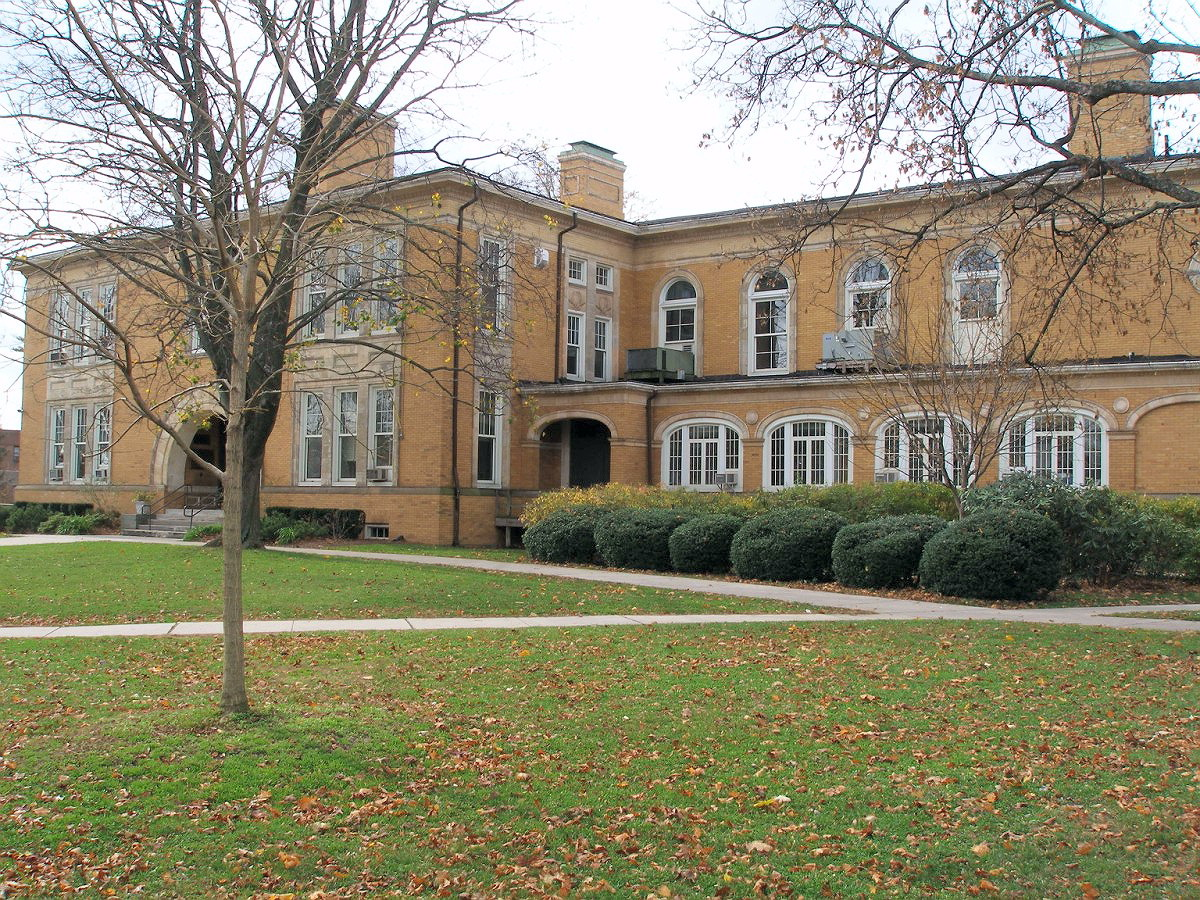
Havemeyer Building, oldest building in the Municipal Center district

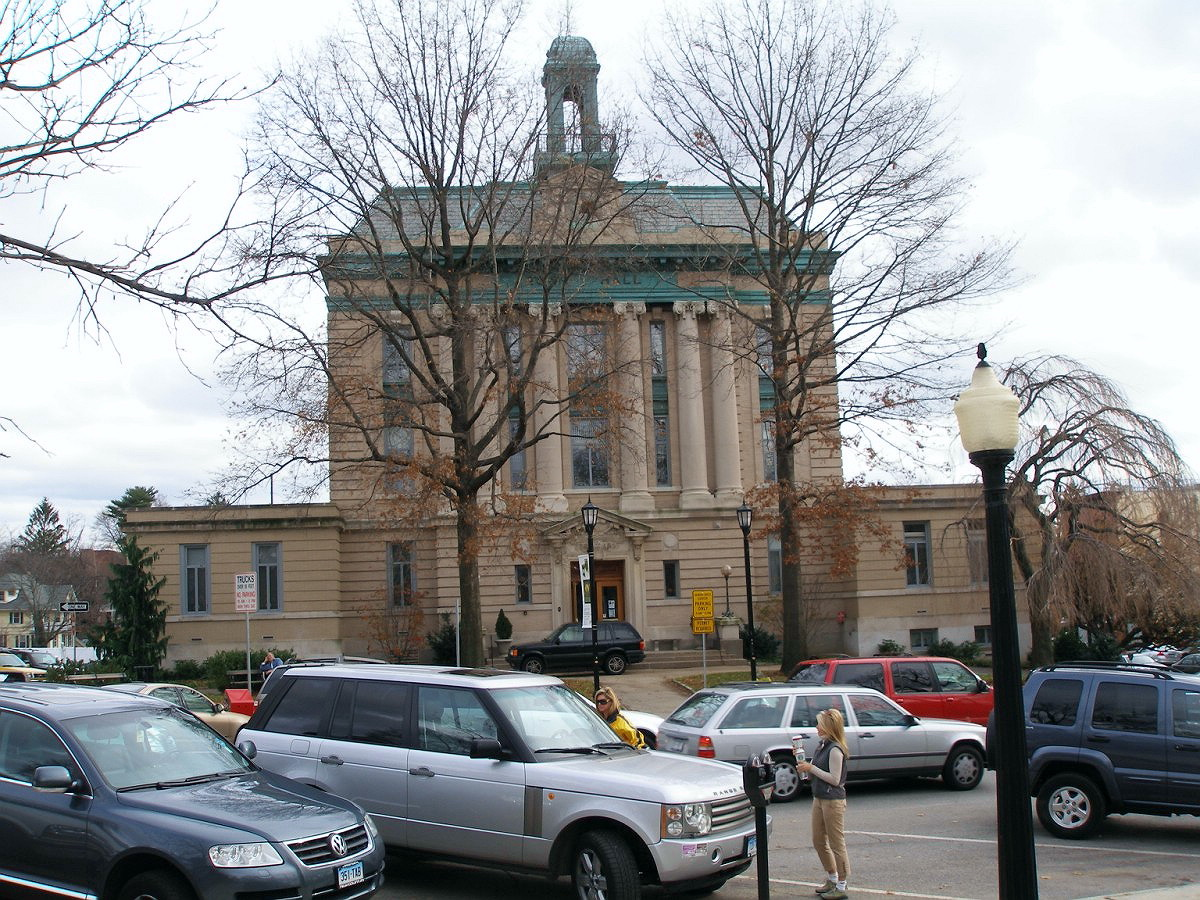
Greenwich Senior Center (Old Town Hall)

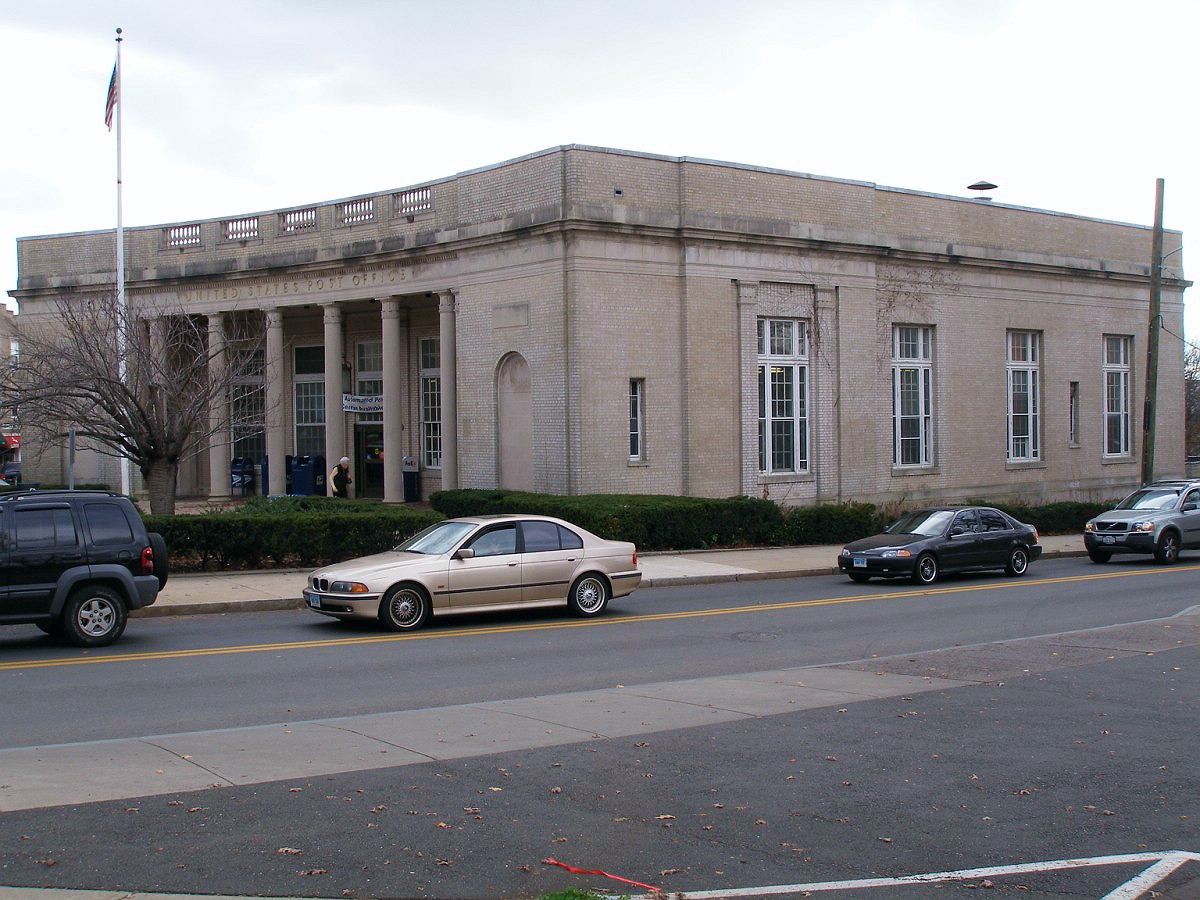
Greenwich Main Post Office

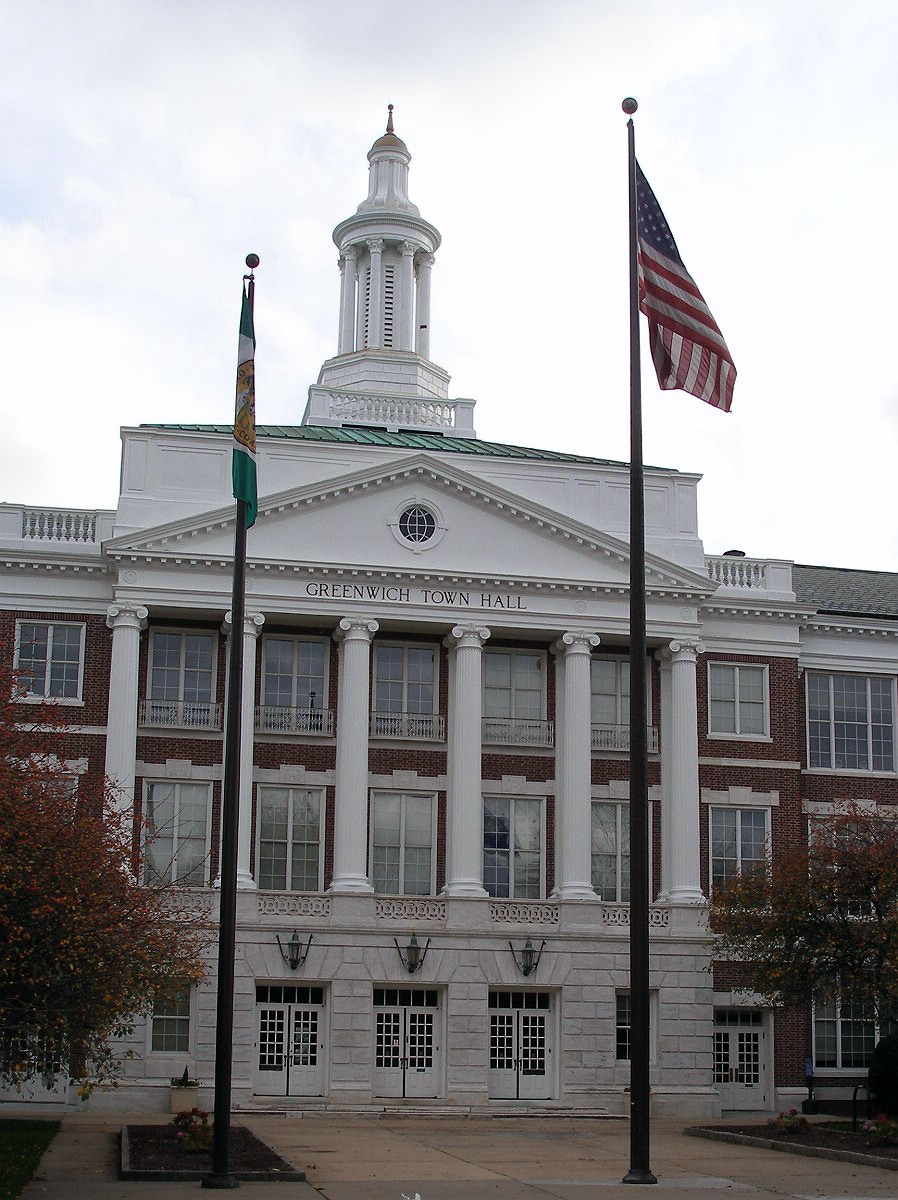
Greenwich Town Hall

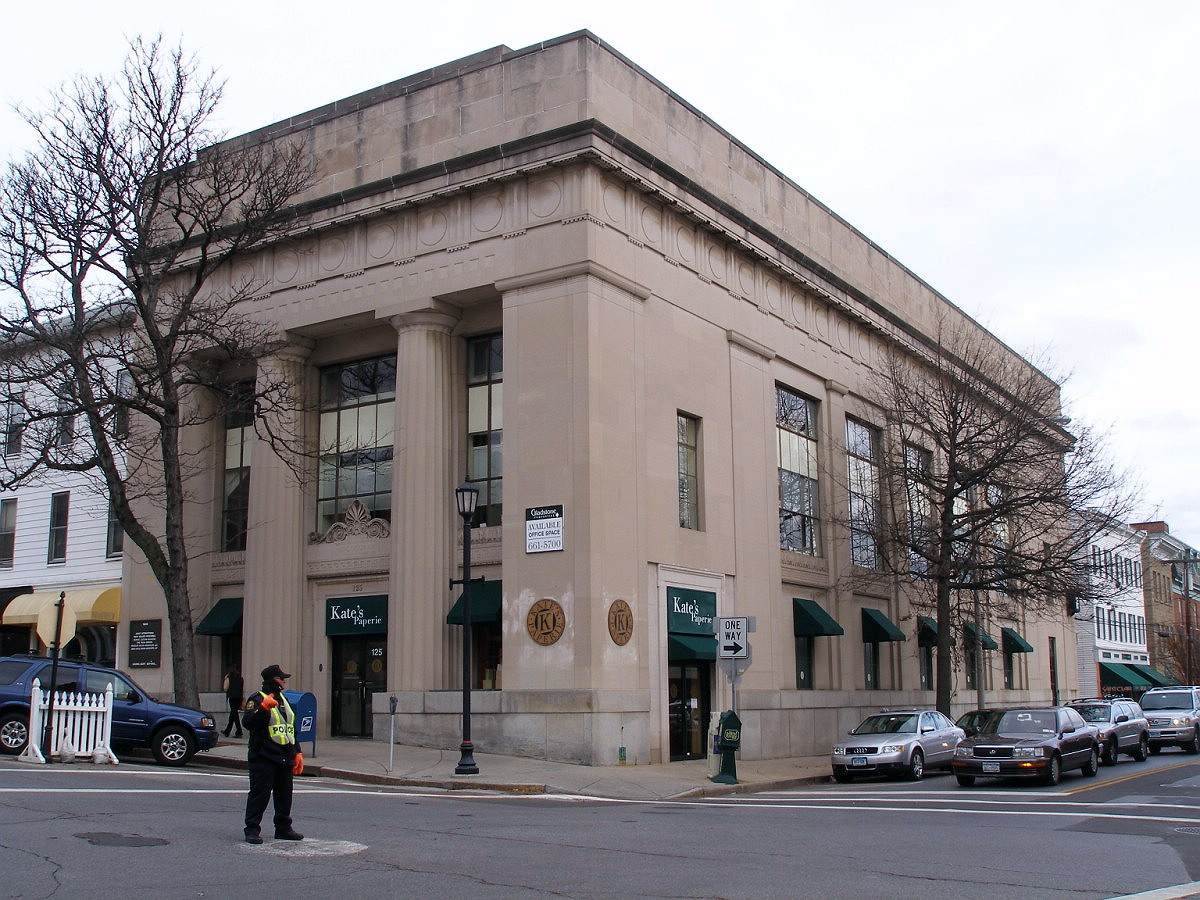
Former Putnam Trust Company building at 125 Greenwich Avenue, in 2010

The Greenwich Avenue Historic District is representative of the architectural diversity that was found in the 19th and early 20th century commercial streetscapes of small cities in Connecticut. Greenwich Avenue is distinguished in that so much of the historic streetscape remains intact today. Some of the more significant buildings and blocks are described below.

- Havemeyer Building – This building located at 290 Greenwich Avenue was the first to be built in the area of the Greenwich Municipal Center Historic District. It was designed by Loring & Phipps and has a Richardsonian Romanesque design with a pronounced horizontality, and further accented by several architectural elements. These include the Syrian arch surrounding the recessed entrance and the elliptical-arched loggia in front of the auditorium wing. The building was originally built for use as a public school, the Havemeyer School, in 1892 by New York philanthropist Henry O. Havemeyer. This building set the standard for architectural design and site planning that would be adhered to by the newer buildings in the Municipal Center district. In front of the building are two war memorials: one for World War II and the Korean War (built 1956), and another to the memory of Col. Raynal Bolling (built 1921). It is currently used by the Greenwich Board of Education.
- Greenwich Senior Center (Old Town Hall) – Across the street from the Havemeyer Building at 299 Greenwich Avenue is the Greenwich Senior Center. The building is a Beaux Arts design by Mowbray and Uffinger, and was built in 1904 to serve as the Town Hall of Greenwich. The building is shaped like a vertical cube and has three stories, rusticated at the first story. The roof rises above a copper cornice and has a clock built below a domed cupola. The building was built by another New York philanthropist, Robert M. Bruce. The building was donated to the town in 1905 upon its completion. The building is listed separately on the National Register.
- Greenwich Main Post Office – The main Post Office of Greenwich was built in 1916. The land, which originally belonged to the Havemeyers, was sold to the U.S. government in 1909 specifically for the construction of a post office. The building is a one-story classical revival design by James A. Wetmore and has a concave façade, which complements the acute angle of the intersection of Greenwich Avenue and Arch Street, where the building is located. The area in front of the building is a municipal park and contains a World War I memorial built in 1927. The post office is also listed separately on the National Register.
- Greenwich Town Hall – The present town hall at 101 Field Point Road across Havemeyer Field from the Havemeyer Building was built in 1925 as the town's second high school. The three-story building is a Georgian Revival design by Guilbert and Betelle. The building features “a centrally placed, two-story Ionic portico that is supported by a rusticated ashlar base containing the main entrance.” The building was converted into use as the town hall in 1977.
- Town Hall Annex – Built in 1906 as the town's first high school, the building is a classical revival design by Wilson Potter. The building has a three-story central portion flanked by 2½-story wings and is located at 27 Havemeyer Place.
- Smith Building – The Smith Building at 289–295 Greenwich Avenue is one of several commercial buildings that complement the classically inspired designs of the Municipal Center buildings. It was built in 1906 to house law offices and has a Georgian Revival / Italian Renaissance design showing a classical arcade and fluted Doric columns.
- Shreve, Crump & Low Building – Another classically inspired building is the Shreve, Crump & Low building on 125 Greenwich Avenue. The building is “a finely detailed, well-proportioned textbook example of the Classical Revival style. An enclosed, self-contained concept of trabeated Greek architecture: the replication in stone of wooden structural members.”
- 300 block of Greenwich Avenue – The 300 block of Greenwich Avenue showcases early 20th-century commercial architecture as interpreted in the Georgian Revival and Classical Revival styles. It is well preserved, with many of the original storefronts still intact. The buildings in this block are located across Greenwich Avenue from the Post Office and were mainly built in the period 1910–1914.
- Greenwich Trust Bank – Located at 94-96 Greenwich Avenue, the Greenwich Trust Bank building was built in 1887 in the Queen Anne style. It has an asymmetrical and eccentric eave line. The building stands in contrast to its neighbor, an 1893 building that was altered in 1931 to have an Art Deco façade.
- Fred Knapp Building – The Fred Knapp Building at 269 Greenwich Avenue is a Late Gothic Revival design that was constructed in 1906. The building has an elaborate limestone tracery on its storefront and parapet adding to the distinctiveness of the building. The building stands in contrast to its newer Queen Anne style neighbor.
- Greenwich Police Department – Originally built in 1925 as a garage, this building at 11 Bruce Place has housed the Greenwich Police Department since 1968. It was excluded from the original Municipal Center district because of its original commercial function. In recent years, the building has undergone major renovations. During that time, the Greenwich Police Department has operated out of the Central Fire House, also known as Greenwich Fire Department Headquarters, next door on Havemeyer Place.
- Greenwich Fire Headquarters – The Central Firehouse has been the Headquarters building of the Greenwich Fire Department since it was built in 1938. Designed with Art Deco style, this three-story limestone ashlar building was designed by Joseph W. Bailey. This is the only building departing from the classical themes of the other buildings in the Municipal Center district. The building has also been shared by the Greenwich Police Department when their building was being renovated in recent years. Located at 15 Havemeyer Place, the large five-garage-bay firehouse has been home to the Greenwich Fire Department, as well as the Amogerone Vol. Fire Co. # 1, the Vol. Hose & Chemical Co. # 1, and the Greenwich Fire Patrol. As of 2012, GFD companies Engine 1, Tower 1, the Special Operations Unit, and the on-duty Deputy Chief have been moved to the Horseneck Ln. Commuter Lot and the current Fire Headquarters is being demolished after nearly 75 years of service to the town.
- St. Mary's Parish Center – The parish center at 200 Greenwich Avenue is a post-modern building that was designed with the historic setting in mind. Its upper story is setback to maintain the massing of its neighbors, and it also echoes the form of the Beaux Arts style 1916 Greenwich Trust Building. The parish offices are located on the second floor and the first floor is leased commercial space. The parish center was built in 1986 and is a non-contributing property but is significant in that it was designed to blend in with its historic neighbors. The parish center is attached to the St. Mary's Roman Catholic Church and Rectory, one of only two churches in the district.
- Commercial blocks at Bruce Park Avenue and West Putnam Avenue – The Bruce Park Avenue block consists of a row of four commercial buildings at the south end of the district. The buildings were built from 1899 to 1919 in a variety of styles. The West Putnam Avenue block showcases the Tudor Revival style that was popular after World War I.

== See also ==
- National Register of Historic Places listings in Greenwich, Connecticut
