= Little Bethel African Methodist Episcopal Church =

Historic church in Connecticut, United States

- U.S. National Register of Historic Places
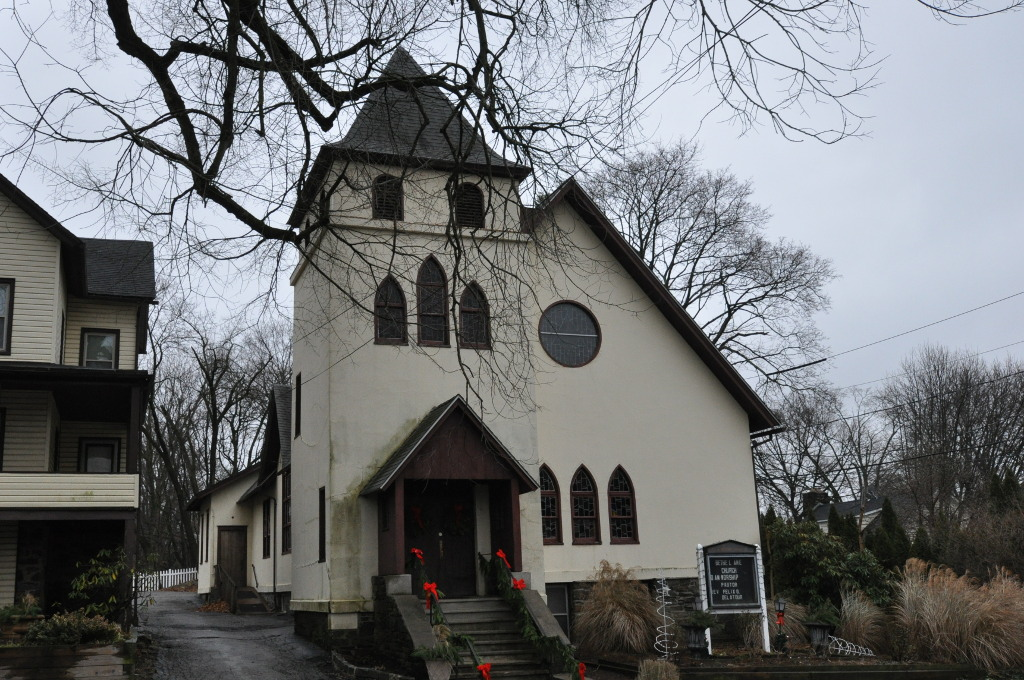

- Location within Connecticut Location within the United States
- Location: 44 Lake Avenue, Greenwich, Connecticut
- Coordinates: 41°1′58″N 73°37′51″W
- Area: 0.2 acres (0.081 ha)
- Built: 1921
- Architect: Meilinggaard, A.N.
- Architectural style: Late Gothic Revival
- NRHP reference No.: 10000831
- Added to NRHP: October 12, 2010

The Little Bethel African Methodist Episcopal Church, now the Bethel African Methodist Episcopal Church, is a historic church building and congregation at 44 Lake Avenue in Greenwich, Connecticut, United States. Founded in 1882, the congregation was Greenwich's first African-American congregation of any denomination, and remains a center of African-American society in the town. Its current church, built in 1921 on the site of its first church, is an example of Late Gothic Revival architecture, and was listed on the National Register of Historic Places in 2010.

== Architecture and history ==
The Bethel AME Church is located north of downtown Greenwich, on the south side of Lake Street opposite the Greenwich Hospital campus. It is a single-story structure, with a gabled roof and stucco exterior. A square tower projects from the front left corner, capped by a pyramidal roof with flared eaves. The main entrance is in the base of the tower, sheltered by a gabled portico. Windows on the tower and building facade are lancet-arched in the Gothic style.

The church congregation was founded in 1882, forming what was then the first major focal point for African-American society in the town. The church eventually outgrew its first edifice, built on this site in 1883, and the present church was built in 1921. The congregation continues to be affiliated with the larger African Methodist Episcopal Church.

== See also ==
- National Register of Historic Places listings in Greenwich, Connecticut
