= River Road-Mead Avenue Historic District =

Historic district in Connecticut, United States

- U.S. National Register of Historic Places
- U.S. Historic district
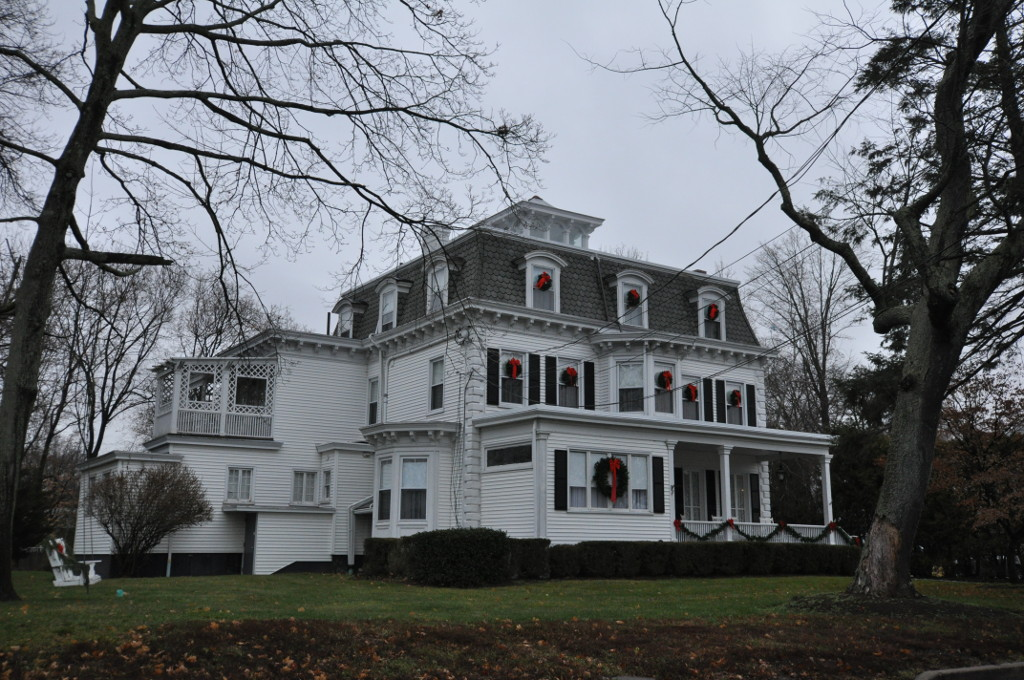
- A Second Empire house on River Road

- Location within Connecticut Location within the United States
- Location: Portions of River Road and Mead Avenue, Greenwich, Connecticut
- Coordinates: 41°2′15″N 73°35′45″W
- Area: 9.667 acres (3.912 ha)
- Built: 1830
- NRHP reference No.: 14000171
- Added to NRHP: April 28, 2014

The River Road-Mead Avenue Historic District encompasses a well-preserved late-19th century upper-class residential area in the Cos Cob area of Greenwich, Connecticut. Extending along River Road between Mead Avenue and Robertson Lane, and along Mead Avenue most of the way to East Putnam Avenue, the district includes fourteen fine houses, most of which were built between 1870 and 1907. The district was listed on the National Register of Historic Places in 1979.

== Description and history ==
The Mead Avenue area was farmland until the 1830s, when William Mead created one of Greenwich's first residential subdivisions, laying out Mead Avenue with half-acre lots. The area was well located, between the commercial centers of Mianus and Cos Cob, which dominated the town's commerce prior to the arrive (in 1848) of the railroad. Despite its good location, only one house was built in the subdivision before the 1860s: the Greek Revival house at 33 Mead Avenue. Before the start of the American Civil War, three more houses were built, all Italianate houses that were built for ship captains. Construction later in the 19th century included houses in River Road which were used primarily as summer residences.

The historic district includes five houses on the north side of River Road, between Mead Avenue and Robertson Lane, and extends northward along Mead Avenue to a point where a series of closely spaced Bungalow style houses begin a transition to the more densely built area near East Putnam Avenue. Excluded from the district area portions of the older house lots that have been further subdivided and built upon later in the 20th century. Buildings contributing to the district's historic character include several carriage barns that have been converted to residences.

== See also ==
- National Register of Historic Places listings in Greenwich, Connecticut
