= French Farm =

- U.S. National Register of Historic Places
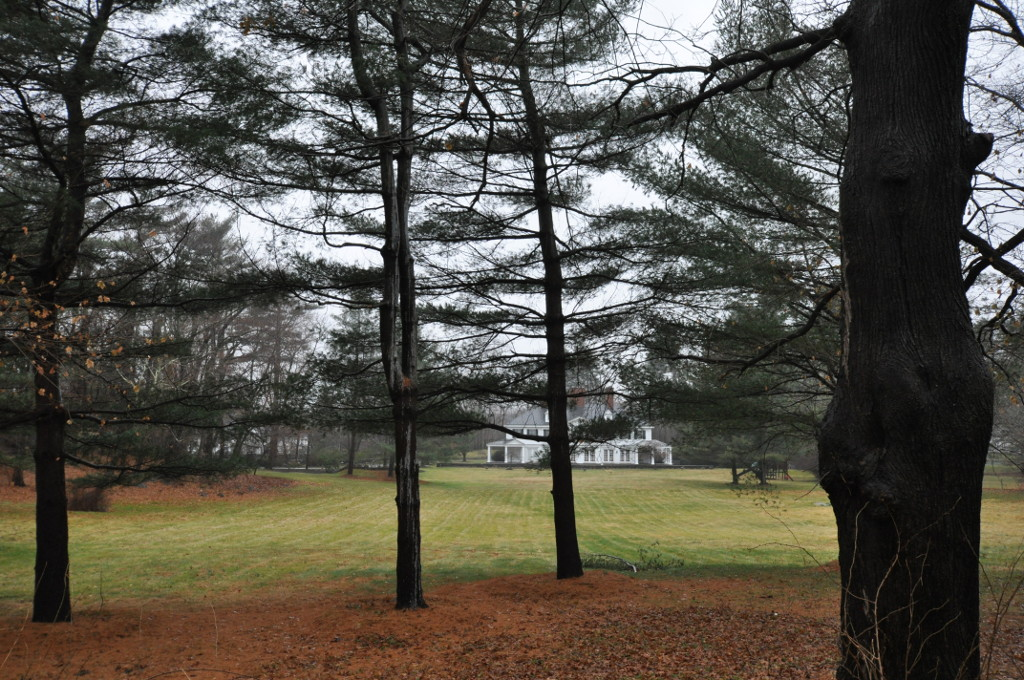

- Location within Connecticut Location within the United States
- Location: Lake and Round Hill Roads, Greenwich, Connecticut
- Coordinates: 41°3′7″N 73°38′24″W
- Area: 35 acres (14 ha)
- Built: 1906
- Architect: Magonigle, Henry van Buren
- NRHP reference No.: 75001918
- Added to NRHP: April 3, 1975

The French Farm is a historic summer estate at the junction of Lake and Round Hill Roads in Greenwich, Connecticut. Developed in the early 1900s, it is a rare surviving estate from the period in which its size and major landscaping elements are preserved. Its major structures (main house and farm outbuildings) were designed by Henry Van Buren Magonigle, a protege of Calvert Vaux. The estate was listed on the National Register of Historic Places in 1975.

== Description and history ==
French Farm is located in a suburban residential setting of geographically central Greenwich, occupying a large parcel bounded on the east by Lake Avenue and the west by Round Hill Road, with the two meeting at its southern tip. Originally 35 acres (14 ha) in size, the property has been reduced by subsequent development, but the main house retains the landscaping in its immediate surroundings. The main house is a large 2-1/2 story frame structure, with a projecting Greek temple portico at its center, and flanking wings giving it a total width of 160 feet (49 m). Although the property boundaries are lined with trees, an open grassy area affords fine views to the house's east-facing front.

The estate was designed by Henry Van Buren Magonigle, a protege of Calvert Vaux who also worked in the offices of McKim, Mead & White. The house was built in 1906 for H.W. Lanier. Lanier sold the property to John French the following year, and French retained Magonigle to design the estate's outbuildings in 1911. The estate represents a well-executed country landscape as espoused by Vaux and Frederick Law Olmsted, and is now of a size and scale that was once common but is now relatively rare in southwestern Connecticut.

== See also ==
- National Register of Historic Places listings in Greenwich, Connecticut
