= United States Post Office (Greenwich, Connecticut) =

- US Post Office-Greenwich Main
- U.S. National Register of Historic Places
- U.S. Historic district – Contributing property
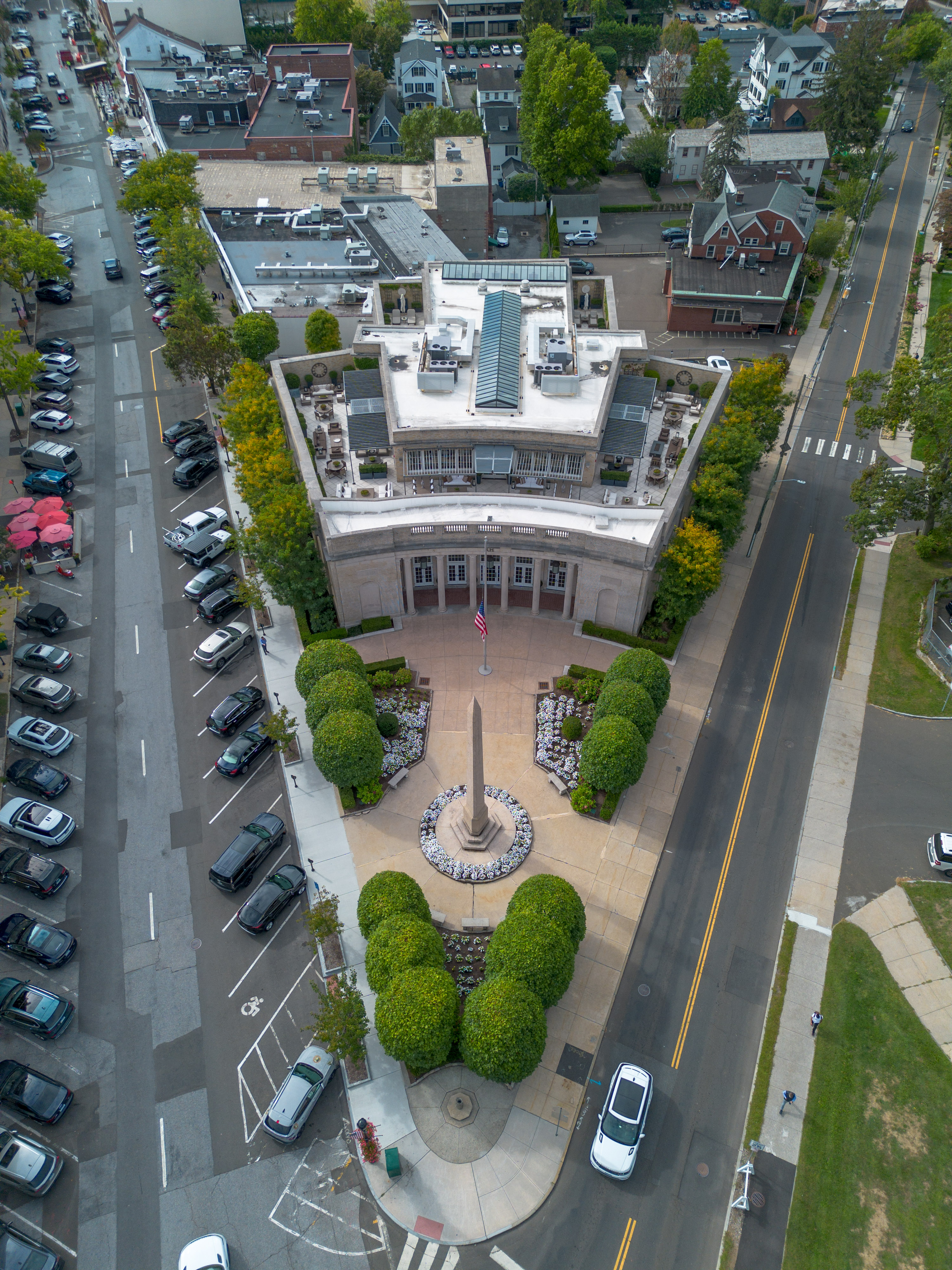
- Historic Post Office in 2025

- Location within Connecticut Location within the United States
- Location: 310 Greenwich Avenue, Greenwich, Connecticut
- Coordinates: 41°1′26″N 73°37′33″W
- Area: 0.5 acres (0.20 ha)
- Built: 1915
- Architect: United States Department of the Treasury
- Architectural style: Classical Revival
- Part of: Greenwich Avenue Historic District (ID89001215)
- NRHP reference No.: 86000077>

Significant dates
- Added to NRHP: January 16, 1986
- Designated CP: August 31, 1989

The United States Post Office is a former post office building at 310 Greenwich Avenue in downtown Greenwich, Connecticut. Built in 1915, it is a good example of Classical Revival architecture, with a distinctive plan predating the Postal Service's standardization of buildings. It was listed on the National Register of Historic Places in 1986. It was included in the Greenwich Municipal Center Historic District which was listed in 1988, and is also included in the Greenwich Avenue Historic District. The building is now in commercial retail use.

== History ==
Greenwich's former post office occupies a prominent triangular site between Greenwich Avenue and Arch Street, with a small public park housing a war memorial in front of it.

The building, completed in 1915, appears to be one of the last of an era of post office design where government buildings were individually designed and were "intended as monuments to bring Federal ideas and sophisticated architecture to small communities." Other post offices, later, were standardized.

The building was acquired by the company Restoration Hardware (now RH) and extensively altered in 2014. The exterior post office facade remains the same. However, the interior is completely renovated to accommodate a two-story, high-value merchandise store. Moreover, Restoration Hardware expanded the rear of the building to make larger gallery space and patio space for customers.

== Architecture ==
The building is a single-story masonry structure, with a steel frame finished in brick and stone. The main facade faces the intersection, consisting of a curved wall with a recessed entry area. The recess is supported by six Corinthian columns, and is topped by a parapet with balustraded elements.

== See also ==
- National Register of Historic Places listings in Greenwich, Connecticut
- List of United States post offices
