= Byram School =

- U.S. National Register of Historic Places
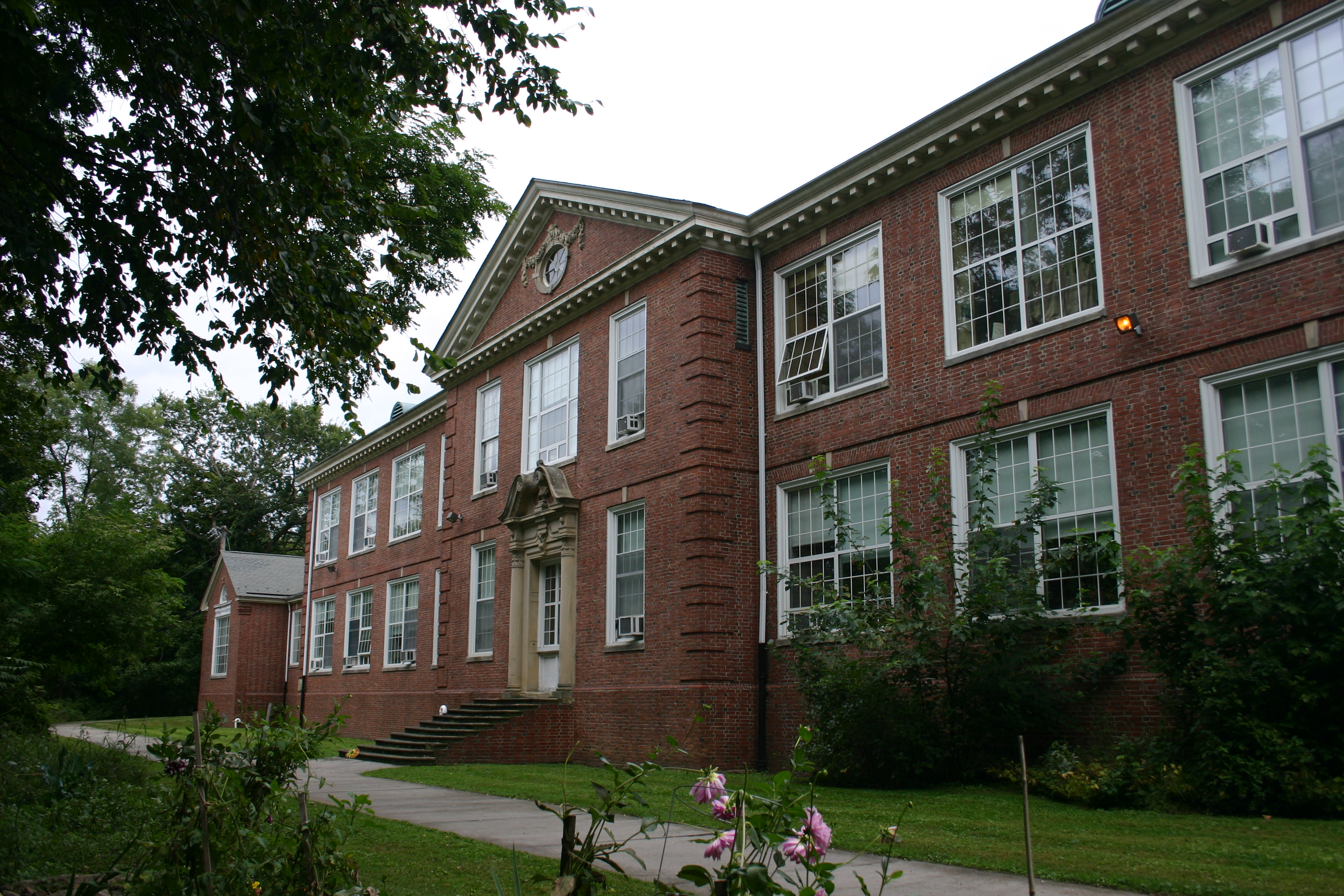

- Location within Connecticut Location within the United States
- Location: Between Sherman Avenue and Western Junior Highway, Greenwich, Connecticut
- Coordinates: 41°0′46″N 73°39′13″W
- Area: 4 acres (1.6 ha)
- Built: 1925
- Architect: Coffin, Errol
- Architectural style: Colonial Revival
- NRHP reference No.: 90001110
- Added to NRHP: August 2, 1990

The Byram School is a historic former school building, located between Sherman Avenue and Western Junior Highway in Greenwich, Connecticut. Completed in 1926, it is a well-preserved example of institutional Colonial Revival architecture, enhanced by a parklike setting. It was used as a school until 1978, and was then converted to senior housing. The building was listed on the National Register of Historic Places on August 2, 1990.

== Description and history ==
The former Byram School is located in westernmost Greenwich, set on a knoll near the Byram River. The property is bounded on the northwest by U.S. Route 1, from which it is not visible, by town-owned family housing to its north, and by town athletic facilities to the south, from which it is separated by a stand of mature trees where a war memorial is located. It is a large brick building with load-bearing masonry walls built out of brick with limestone trim. Colonial Revival features include brick corner quoining, a cornice studded with modillion blocks, and a fully pedimented gable above the main building entrance, in which there is a round window topped by a garland. The entrance is flanked by engaged Corinthian columns and topped by an elaborate scrolled pediment.

The school was designed by Errol Coffin, a local architect, and was completed in 1926, replacing an older wood-frame structure located across US 1 from this site. It is a well-preserved example of institutional Colonial Revival architecture. Originally rectangular in shape, it was extended by an addition in 1936 by an unknown architect. In the 1960s, much of its interior decorative material was removed as part of renovations to modernize the building for code. It served as an elementary school until 1978, and was converted to senior housing in 1987–89.

== See also ==
- National Register of Historic Places listings in Greenwich, Connecticut
