= Josiah Wilcox House =

Historic house in Connecticut, United States

- U.S. National Register of Historic Places
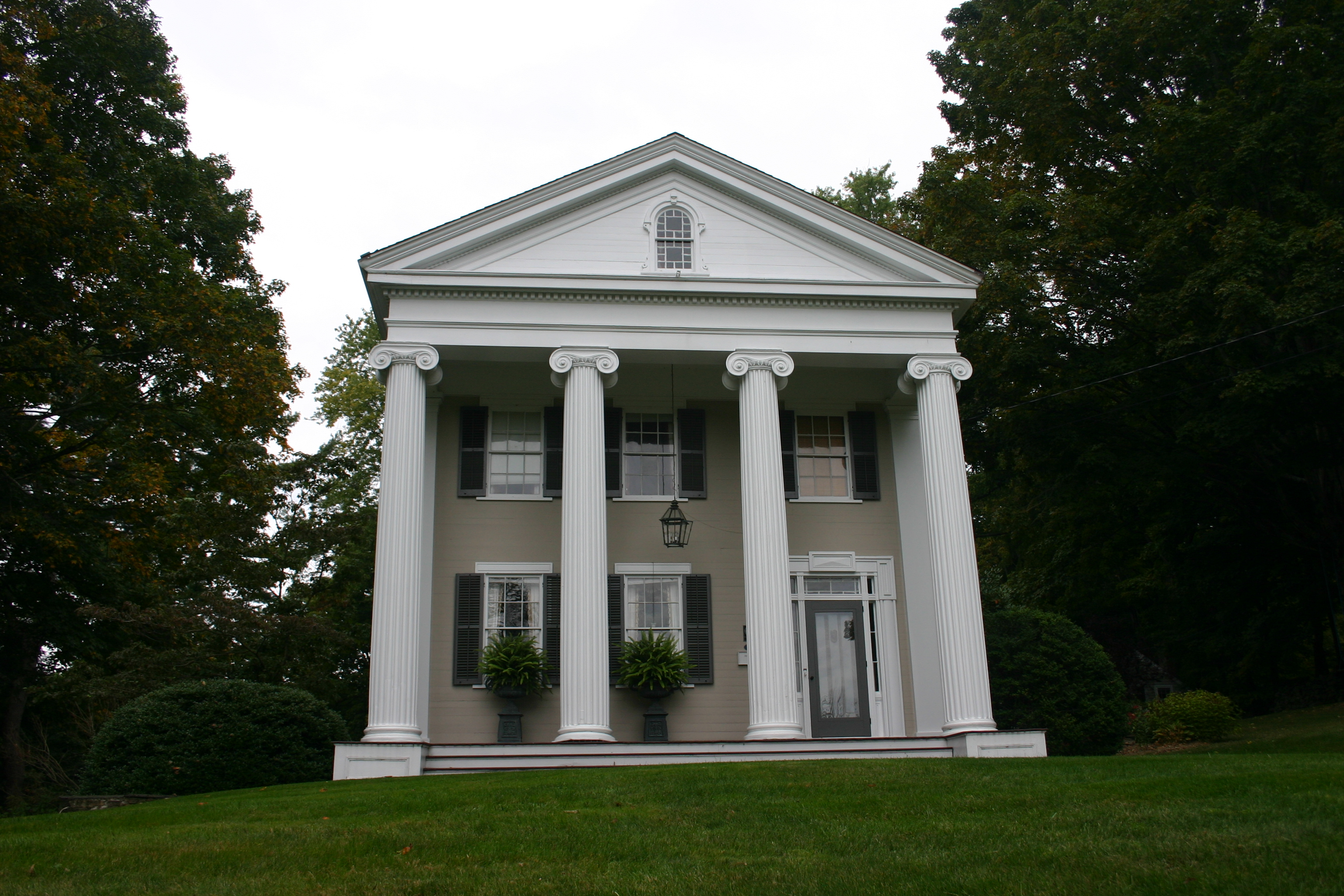

- Location within Connecticut Location within the United States
- Location: 354 Riversville Road, Greenwich, Connecticut
- Coordinates: 41°3′44″N 73°33′27″W
- Area: 1.5 acres (0.61 ha)
- Architectural style: Greek Revival
- NRHP reference No.: 88001344
- Added to NRHP: November 30, 1988

The Josiah Wilcox House is a historic house at 354 Riversville Road in Greenwich, Connecticut. Built in 1838, it is one of the town's finest examples of Greek Revival architecture. It was listed on the National Register of Historic Places in 1988.

== Description and history ==
The Josiah Wilcox House is located in a residential area of central western Greenwich, on the west side of Riversville Road north of its crossing of the Merritt Parkway. It is a 2 1/2-story wood-frame structure with a front-gable roof, and clapboarded exterior. The building's most prominent feature is its impressive Greek Revival temple front, consisting of four fluted Ionic columns supporting a triangular gable pediment. A round-arch window is located at the center of the gable. The main facade is three bays wide and finished with flushboarding, and has the entrance in the right bay, framed by sidelight and transom windows. The building corners are adorned with plain pilasters. The interior retains many original features, including the main staircase, and fireplace surrounds.

The house was built in 1838 for Josiah Wilcox. It has been little-altered since the late 19th century, and is one of Greenwich's finest Greek Revival buildings. Wilcox was a prominent local businessman, operating a factory on the nearby Byram River that manufactured tinning tools and carriage parts. The house remained in the Wilcox family until 1943.

== See also ==
- National Register of Historic Places listings in Greenwich, Connecticut
