= Samuel Ferris House =

Historic house in Greenwich, Connecticut, U.S.

- U.S. National Register of Historic Places
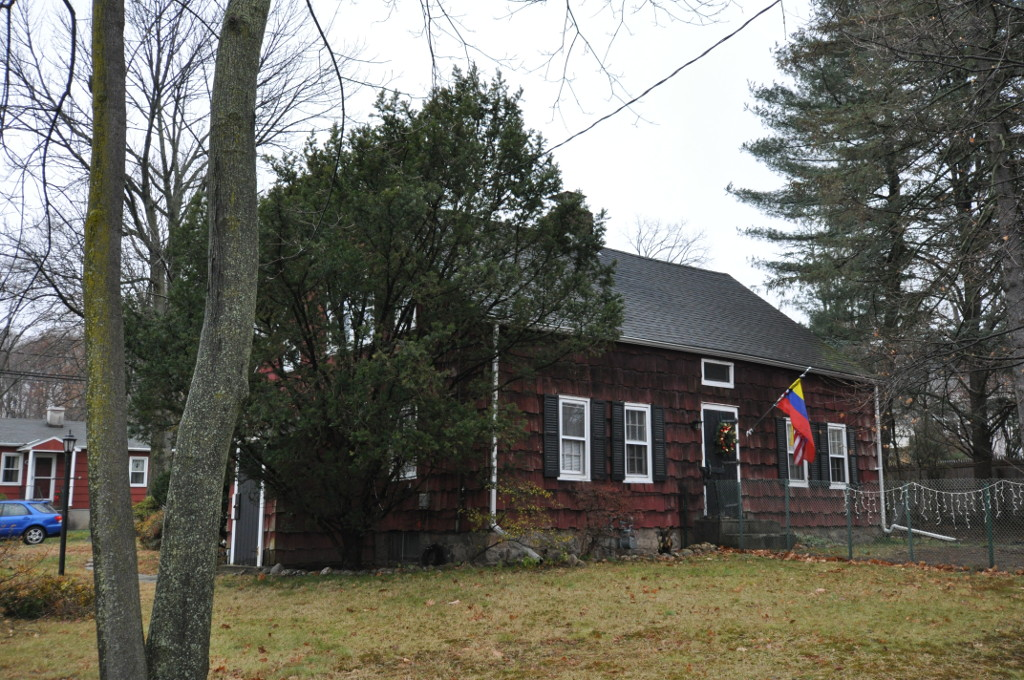

- Location within Connecticut Location within the United States
- Interactive map showing the location of Samuel Ferris House
- Location: 1 Cary Road, Greenwich, Connecticut, U.S.
- Coordinates: 41°2′33″N 73°35′22″W
- Area: 1 acre (0.40 ha)
- Architectural style: Colonial, New England Colonial
- NRHP reference No.: 89001086
- Added to NRHP: August 10, 1989

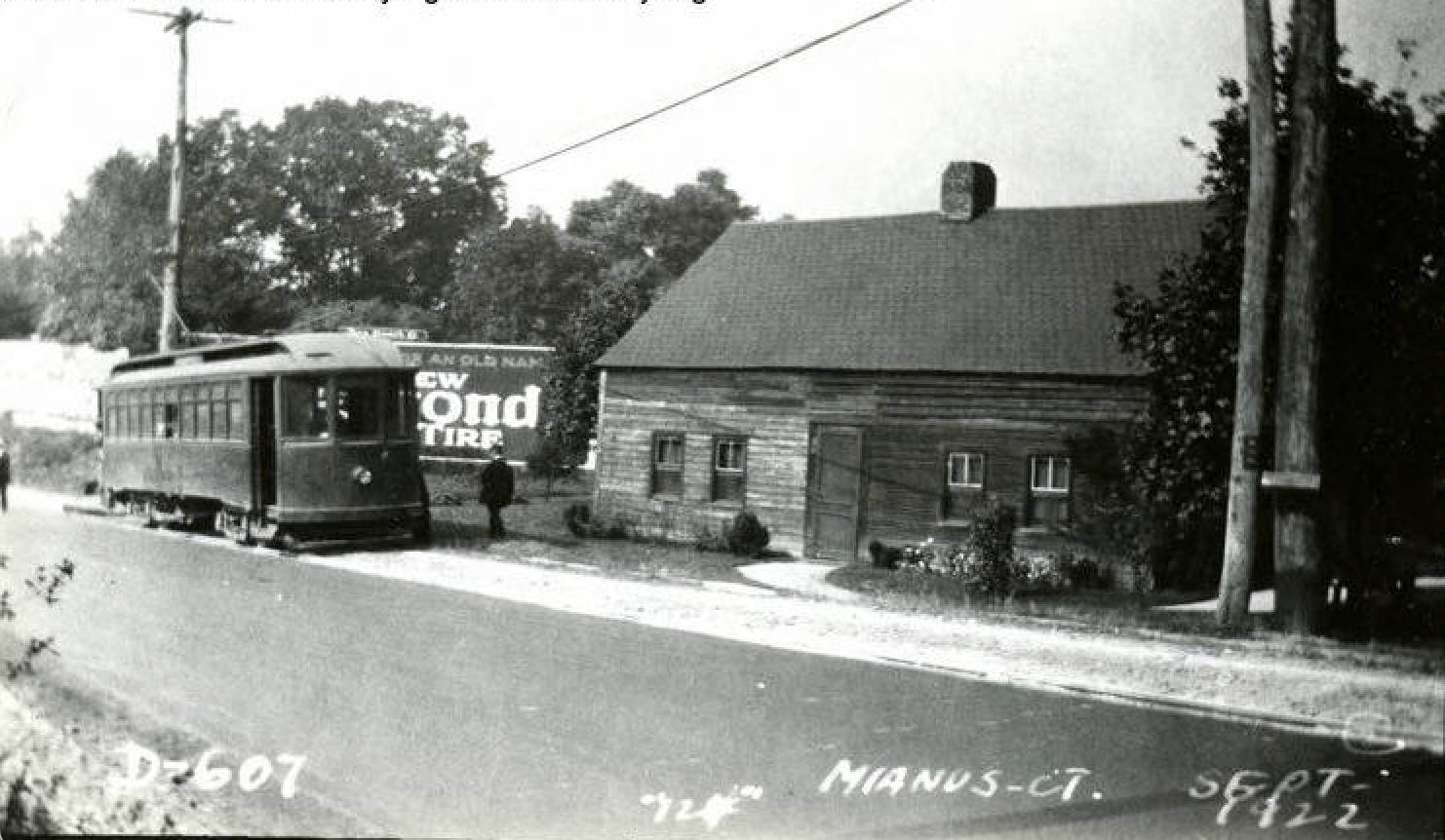
The Samuel Ferris House c. 1922

The Samuel Ferris House is a historic house at 1 Cary Road in Greenwich, Connecticut, United States. Built around 1760 and enlarged around 1800, it is a well-preserved example of a Colonial period Cape, a rare survivor of the form to still stand facing the Boston Post Road in the town. It is also locally significant for its connections to the Ferris family, early settlers of the area. The house was listed on the U.S. National Register of Historic Places in 1989.

== Description and history ==
The Samuel Ferris House stands in the Riverside neighborhood of eastern Greenwich, on a parcel bounded on the west by Cary Road, the north by Fitch Lane, and the south by the Boston Post Road (United States Route 1). It is a 1 1/2-story wood-frame structure, with a gabled roof, central chimney, and shingled exterior. The main facade faces south toward the Boston Post Road, and is five bays wide, with sash windows arranged symmetrically around the entrance. The entrance is simply framed, with a small transom window above. Its interior features are indicative of two major stages of construction, with vertical wall planking typical of older colonial construction, and a fireplace surround with feathered panels that date to about 1800.

The oldest portion of the house dates to 1760 or earlier, consisting of the three western bays. The two eastern bays were added about 1800. The house was probably built by Samuel Ferris, whose family was among the early settlers of the area, and was the farmhouse for a 30-acre (12 ha) farm. The building was moved about 80 feet and put onto a new foundation in the 1920s, when the Post Road was realigned. In 1947, the last surviving Ferris descendant gave the farm property to the town, which built housing on most of the farmland, and sold the house back into private ownership in 1957.

As of 2025, the house is still a private residence.

== See also ==
- National Register of Historic Places listings in Greenwich, Connecticut
