= Strickland Road Historic District =

Historic district in Connecticut, United States

- U.S. National Register of Historic Places
- U.S. Historic district
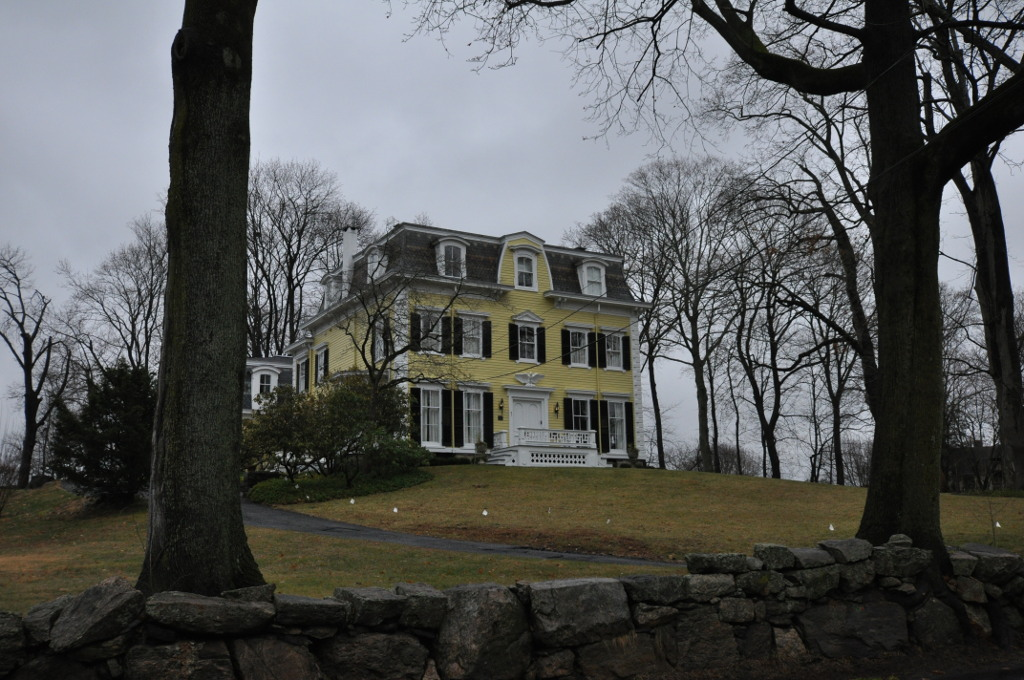

- Location within Connecticut Location within the United States
- Location: 19-47 Strickland Road, Cos Cob, Connecticut
- Coordinates: 41°2′6″N 73°36′3″W
- Area: 9 acres (3.6 ha)
- Architectural style: Late 19th and 20th Century Revivals, Late Victorian, Colonial
- NRHP reference No.: 77001625
- Added to NRHP: March 22, 1990

The Strickland Road Historic District of Greenwich, Connecticut is a 9-acre (3.6 ha) historic district that was listed on the U.S. National Register of Historic Places in 1990. The district extends along Strickland Road in the Cos Cob section of Greenwich, between its junction River Road in the south, to just north of its junction with Loughlin Road in the north. It represents a well-preserved cross-section of residential architecture dating coverint a 200-year period, from about 1740 to 1934. It includes the c. 1730 Bush-Holley House, a historic house museum which is a National Historic Landmark for it role in the Cos Cob art colony. There are 28 primary contributing buildings in the district. Most of the buildings are wood-frame structures between one and three stories in height; the notable exceptions are two of the later houses, which are Tudor Revival in style and have brick and stucco exteriors.

The Cos Cob area was settled in the 17th century as a colonial maritime community, at first by Dutch settlers (as part of New Netherland) and later by English settlers. The Strickland Road area was known as the Lower Landing, and flourished in the 18th century, particularly through the efforts of David Bush, the Dutch builder of the Bush-Holley House. It was primarily a transportation center, with packet boats serving other area ports, and some of the finer houses on Strickland Road were built by sea captains. The area declined in importance after the packet boats were supplanted by the railroad in the mid-19th century, and became a residential enclave. Its last major industrial site, a tidal grist mill, burned in 1899. Most of the buildings in the district date to the early 20th century, in the Bungalow and Tudor Revival styles popular at that time.

== See also ==
- National Register of Historic Places listings in Greenwich, Connecticut
