= Sylvanus Selleck Gristmill =

- U.S. National Register of Historic Places
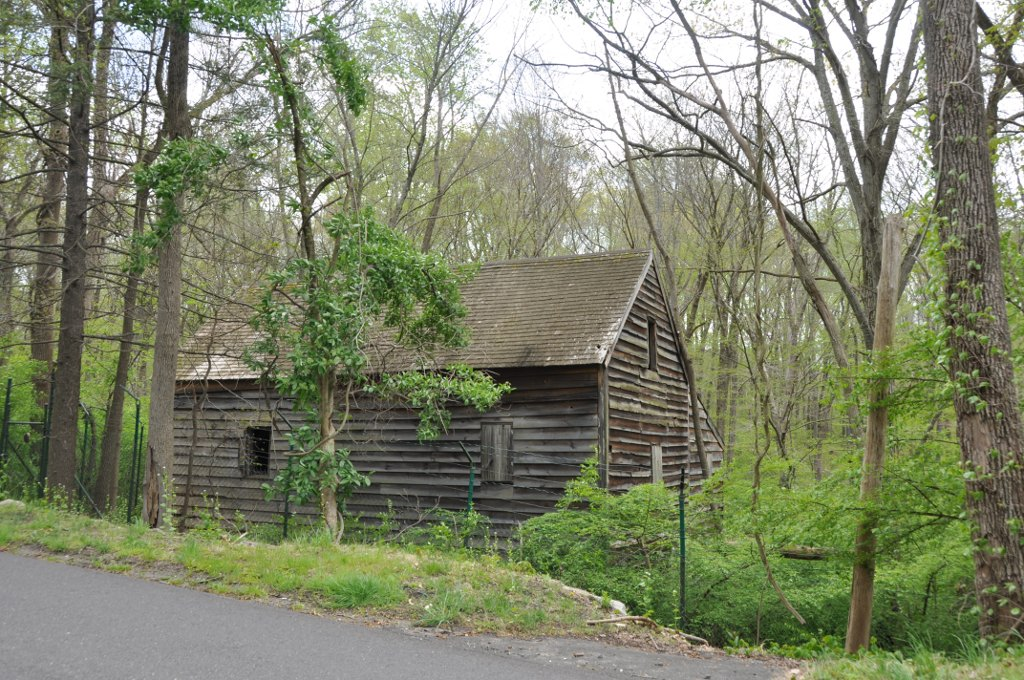

- Location within Connecticut Location within the United States
- Location: 124 Old Mill Road, Greenwich, Connecticut
- Coordinates: 41°5′31″N 73°39′33″W
- Area: less than one acre
- Built: c. 1796
- Architect: Selleck, Sylvanus; Knapp, Edwin
- NRHP reference No.: 90001109
- Added to NRHP: August 2, 1990

The Sylvanus Selleck Gristmill, also known as the Edwin Knapp Gristmill, is a historic gristmill at 124 Old Mill Road in Greenwich, Connecticut. Built about 1796, it is one of the oldest mill buildings in the state, and a rare surviving example of brace-frame construction. It was listed on the National Register of Historic Places in 1990.

== Description and history ==
The Sylvanus Selleck Gristmill is located in a rural setting of northern Greenwich, on the south side of Old Mill Road. It is set near the road, on a lot that slopes down to Converse Pond Brook. A now-breached stone dam spans the brook upstream of the mill building, which is a modestly sized wood-frame structure covered by a gabled roof and wooden clapboards. A shed-roof ell extends on the downhill (south) side of the building, which is set on a fieldstone foundation that is fully exposed on the downhill side. The building was framed with beams of oak and chestnut, with bracing added to support the heavy milling equipment. A stone tailrace extends west from the building, giving way to an unlined former channel which leads back to the streambed.

The mill was built by Sylvanus Selleck in about 1796, and is one of only two known 18th-century mill buildings in the state. Selleck was a farmer who apparently sought to supplement his farm income by providing milling services to other nearby farmers. An addition in about 1850 is believed to be by Edwin Knapp. The mill is a rare surviving example of braced-frame construction, which was once common. The mill was operated until Edwin Knapp's death in 1895.

== See also ==
- National Register of Historic Places listings in Greenwich, Connecticut
