= Fourth Ward Historic District (Greenwich, Connecticut) =

Historic district in Connecticut, United States

- U.S. National Register of Historic Places
- U.S. Historic district
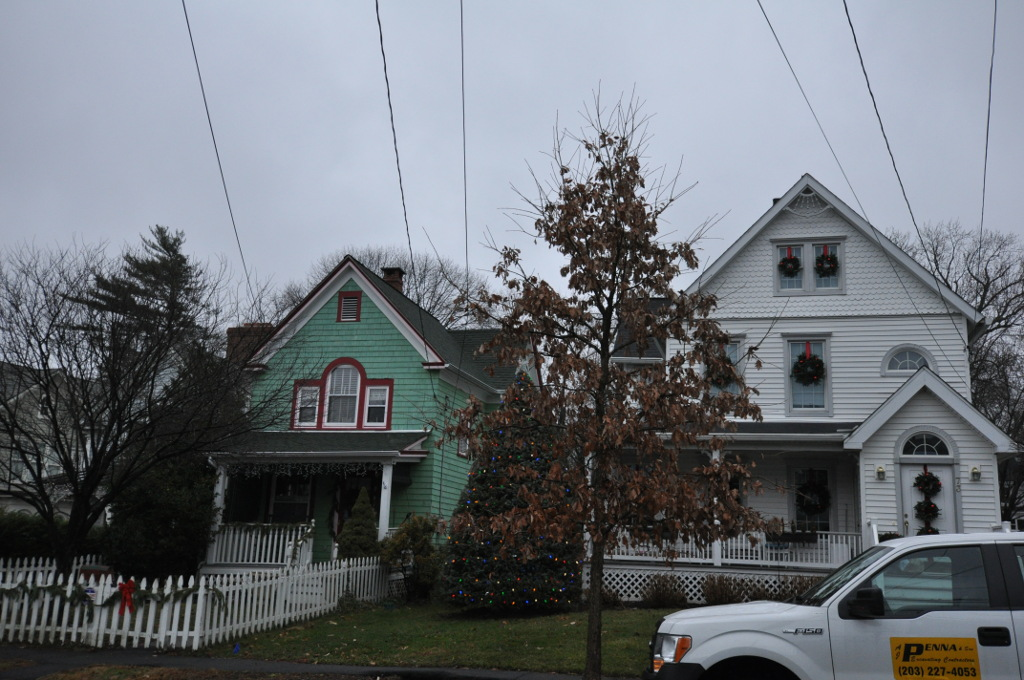

- Location within Connecticut Location within the United States
- Location: Roughly along Church, Division, Northfield and William Streets; and Putnam Court and Sherwood Place, Greenwich, Connecticut
- Coordinates: 41°2′6″N 73°37′40″W
- Area: 28.4 acres (11.5 ha)
- Architectural style: Queen Anne, Italianate, et al.
- NRHP reference No.: 00000324
- Added to NRHP: April 21, 2000

The Fourth Ward Historic District encompasses an early urban residential subdivision of Greenwich, Connecticut. Extending north from Connecticut Route 1 along Sherwood Place, Church Street, and adjacent streets, it is one of two subdivisions created before the arrival of the railroad in Greenwich in 1848. It is characterized by dense residential construction, with architectural styles from the Greek Revival to early 20th-century styles. The district was listed on the National Register of Historic Places in 2000.

== Description and history ==
The Fourth Ward area is located near an early commercial district in Greenwich, that arose along the Boston Post Road (now Connecticut Route 1) during its period as an important stagecoach and travel route. It was developed in 1836 by William Sherwood as an area of moderate-income housing, a contrast to the higher-style upper-class housing that then lined the Post Road. Lots were laid out with narrow frontage, and the early houses that were built there were stylistically more modest. Sherwood laid out Sherwood Place (then called Mechanics Street), and the northern and western parts of the ward, including Church Street and parts of Northfield, Division, and William Streets, was developed in the 1870s. This later development was characterized by slightly larger lots and houses, and includes the district's finer examples of period architecture.

The historic district 28.4 acres (11.5 ha) in size In 2000 it included 159 contributing buildings. The two oldest houses in the district are Greek Revival John Knapp House from 1837 and the John Kirk House from 1838. Most of the buildings are single and multifamily residences; construction in the early 20th century was predominantly multifamily buildings, either two or four units in size. Almost all of the buildings are of wood-frame construction, 1-1/2 to 2 1/2 stories in size, and are in a diversity of architectural styles. Non-residential buildings include First Baptist Church on Northfield Street; the district also includes the former site of Greenwich's first Roman Catholic church, which is now a playground.

== See also ==
- National Register of Historic Places listings in Greenwich, Connecticut
