= Greenwich Town Hall (Connecticut) =

- U.S. National Register of Historic Places
- U.S. Historic district – Contributing property
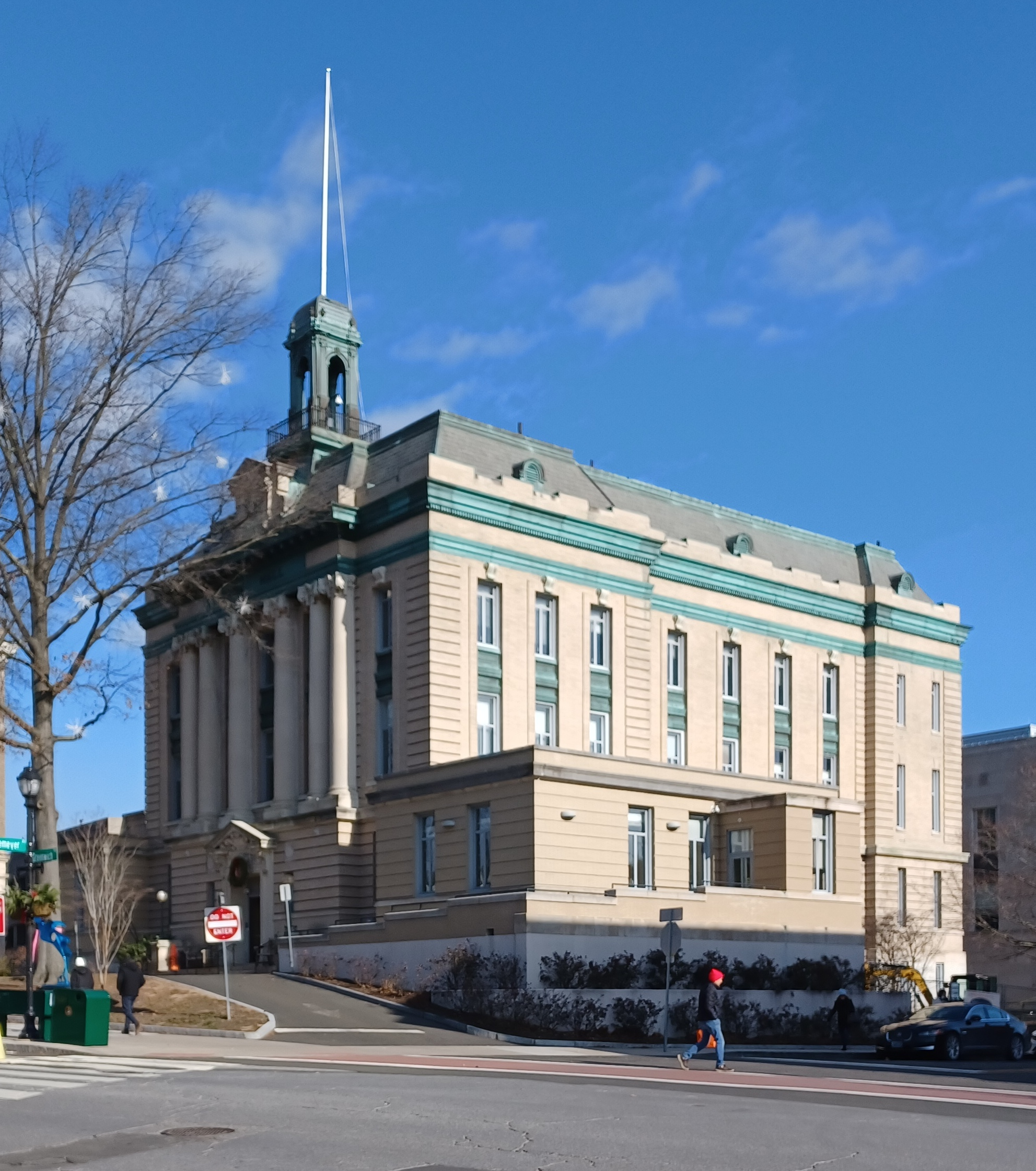

- Location within Connecticut Location within the United States
- Location: 299 Greenwich Avenue, Greenwich, Connecticut
- Coordinates: 41°1′30″N 73°37′32″W
- Area: 1 acre (0.40 ha)
- Built: 1905
- Architect: Mowbray and Uffinger; Smith, W.J.
- Architectural style: Beaux Arts
- Part of: Greenwich Avenue Historic District (ID89001215)
- NRHP reference No.: 87000807

Significant dates
- Added to NRHP: May 21, 1987
- Designated CP: August 31, 1989

The Greenwich Senior Center, formerly Greenwich Town Hall, is a historic municipal building at 299 Greenwich Avenue in the business district of Greenwich, Connecticut. USA. Built in 1905, it is a prominent local example of Beaux Arts architecture, and served as the town's center of government until 1977. The building was added to the National Register of Historic Places on May 21, 1987.

== Description and history ==
The former Greenwich Town Hall is located near the center of the Greenwich's central business district, on the east side of Greenwich Avenue at Havemeyer Place. The building is shaped like a vertical cube, three stories, with single-story wings extending to the sides. The first floor is rusticated stone, while the upper floors are more finely finished, with two-story Ionic columns rising to a mansard roof. The roof rises above a copper cornice and has a clock built below a domed cupola. The main entrance has an elaborate surround, with pilasters rising to a heavy gabled pediment.

The building is a Beaux Arts design by Mowbray and Uffinger, and was built in 1905 by W.J. Smith to serve as the Town Hall of Greenwich. Its construction was funded by Robert M. Bruce and his sister Sarah. Robert Bruce was a New York City cotton merchant and philanthropist whose home is now the Bruce Museum of Arts and Science; the Bruces were well known for their local philanthropy. In 1977, the town government offices were moved to a building that was formerly used by the Greenwich High School at Field Point Road. This building is now used as a senior center.

== See also ==
- National Register of Historic Places listings in Greenwich, Connecticut
