= Round Hill Historic District =

Historic district in Connecticut, United States

- U.S. National Register of Historic Places
- U.S. Historic district
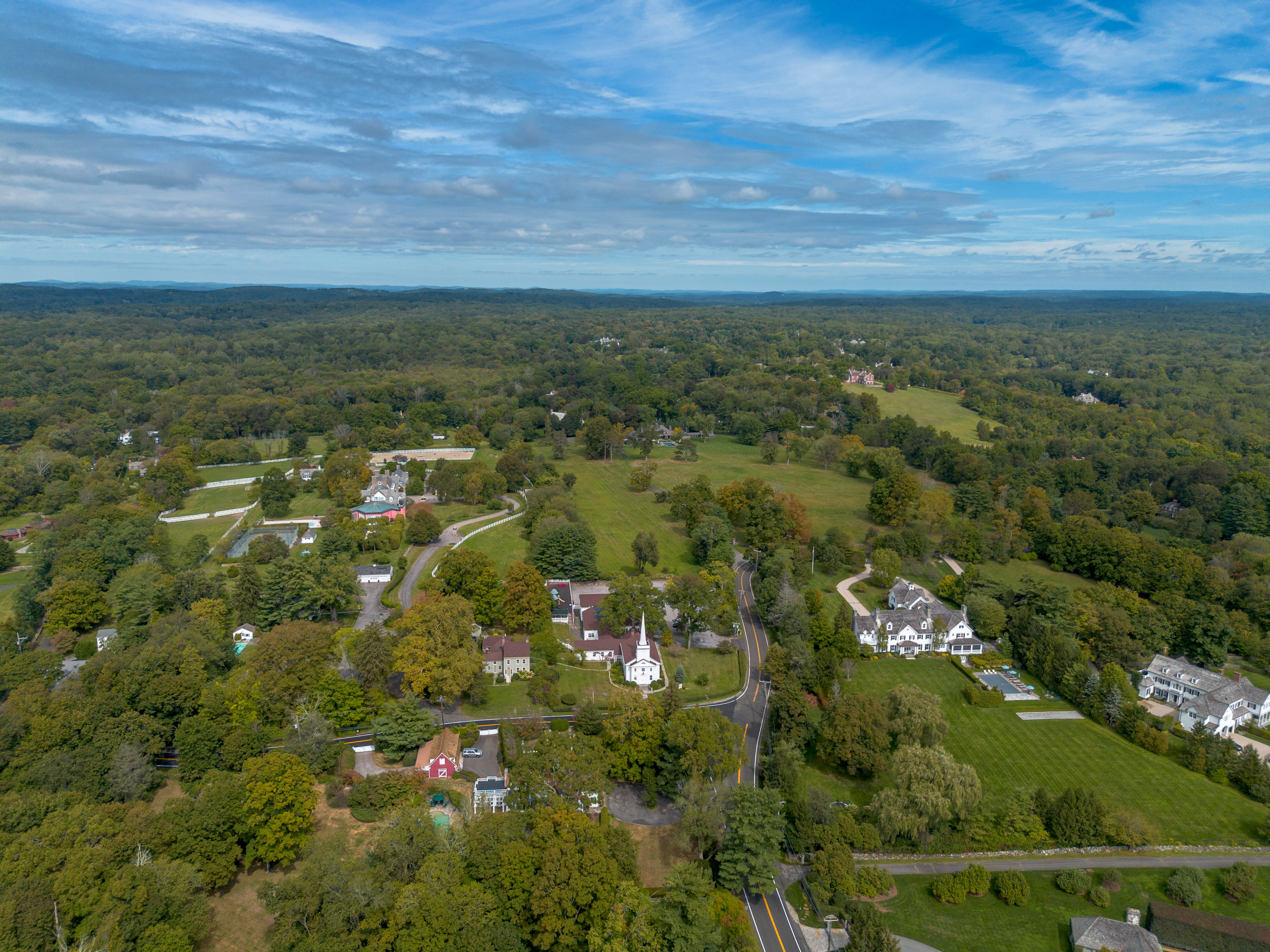
- Round Hill Historic District in 2025

- Location within Connecticut Location within the United States
- Location: Roughly, Junction of John Street and Round Hill Road, Greenwich, Connecticut
- Coordinates: 41°6′17″N 73°40′6″W
- Area: 8 acres (3.2 ha)
- Built: 1926
- Architect: Dominick, William F.
- Architectural style: Colonial Revival, Colonial
- NRHP reference No.: 96000779
- Added to NRHP: July 25, 1996

The Round Hill Historic District encompasses the village center of Round Hill, a formerly rural (and now suburban) area in northwestern Greenwich, Connecticut. Centered on the junction of John Street and Round Hill Road, the district includes a church, cemetery, two houses, and a former district school, the latter dating to 1750. Established as a center for local farmers in the 18th century, it was transformed in the early 20th century into a center for suburban and summer estate residents. The district was listed on the National Register of Historic Places in 1996.

== Description and history ==
The Round Hill area began as a "backcountry" farming region of Greenwich, populated by English settlers who moved inland from its coastal areas, and by Dutch settlers from New Amsterdam and the Province of New York, both of which contested control of the area through the late 17th century. The oldest building at Round Hill is the Brown-Kenworthy House, built about 1728 and located next to the First Church of Round Hill. The church was a comparatively late addition to the village, its congregation dating only to the 1820s and the building to 1828; the adjacent cemetery was formally established in 1826. The oldest civic building in the village is a former district schoolhouse, built by 1750 and converted to residential use by incorporation into the house now standing just south of John Street on Round Hill Road.

As the 19th century progressed, the area continued to be mainly agricultural, but by the early 20th century, expanding suburban development transformed the area, as farms were converted into country estates or subdivided for residential construction. The church was at first less important to many newcomers, but its closure in the early 1900s prompted a push for its preservation, and it soon reopened as a non-denominational community church. It and the other older buildings in the area were given Colonial Revival makeovers, in some instances stripping away Victorian alterations.

== See also ==
- National Register of Historic Places listings in Greenwich, Connecticut
