= Glenville =

Glenville may refer to:

== Places ==
=== Canada ===
- Glenville, Ontario
- Glenville, Cumberland County, Nova Scotia
- Glenville, Inverness County, Nova Scotia

=== Ireland ===
- Glenville, County Cork

=== United Kingdom ===
- Glenville, County Antrim (also known as Leamore), a townland in the civil parish of Layd, County Antrim, Northern Ireland

=== United States ===
- Glenville, Alabama
- Glenville (Eutaw, Alabama) a house on the National Register of Historic Places in Eutaw, Alabama
- Glenville, Arkansas, a place in Nevada County
- Glenville, California, former name of Glennville, California
- Glenville, Connecticut
- Glenville, Delaware
- Glenville, Minnesota
- Glenville, Mississippi, a community in Panola County
- Glenville, New York
- Glenville, North Carolina
- Glenville, Pennsylvania
- Glenville, West Virginia
- Glenville, Cleveland, a neighborhood in Cleveland, Ohio
  - Glenville shootout, which took place there

== Sports ==
- Glenville F.C., an association football club in Palmerstown, Dublin, Ireland
- Glenville, a South African association football club that played in the Federation Professional League

== See also ==
- Glenville School (disambiguation)
- Glennville (disambiguation)
- Glenvil, Nebraska
- Glenvil Township, Clay County, Nebraska
