= Alfred W. Woods =

American architect

Personal details
- Born: January 30, 1857; St. Clair County, Illinois
- Died: December 29, 1942 (aged 85); Lincoln, Nebraska
- Spouse: Haidee Finney (m. 1885–1942)
- Children: 5
- Profession: Architect

Alfred W Woods (January 30, 1857 – December 29, 1942) was a prominent architect in Lincoln, Nebraska recognized for his specialization and design in over 100 Nebraskan churches and synagogues as well as his invention in 1921 of the standard foot to decimal system. Woods collaborated on a variety of projects with fellow Nebraskan architect Artemus Roberts during 1890–1903. Wood's and Robert's most notable work was the construction of Fairview, commonly known as the William Jennings Bryan House, which was declared a U.S.National Historic Landmark in 1963. William Jennings Bryan was a Nebraskan politician, who is argued as one of America's most significant American politicians for the Democratic Party who ran three times as a candidate for the presidential election.

Woods's speciality in church design led to the construction of numerous Lincoln buildings including the Ebenezer Congressional Church, First United Methodist Church, Tifereth Israel Synagogue, and the Old Woods Brothers Company. The Old Woods Brothers Company is a highly recognized building that is located in the Historic Haymarket in Lincoln. Woods died at the age of 85 in 1942.

== Work ==
- William Jennings Bryan House (Lincoln, Nebraska) with Artemus Roberts, a National Landmark
- Tifereth Israel Synagogue, 344 S. 18th St. in Lincoln, Nebraska. NRHP listed
- Sparks Hall, 10th and Main Sts. Chadron, Nebraska. NRHP listed
- Park Hill, 1913 S 41st St Lincoln, NE Artemas Roberts & A.W. Woods. NRHP listed
- Quinn Chapel African Methodist Episcopal Church and Parsonage, 1225 S. 9th St. Lincoln, NE. NRHP listed.
- Glenville School, 401 S. Fifth St. Glenville, Nebraska. NRHP listed
