= Glenville School =

Glenville School may refer to:

- Glenville School (Greenwich, Connecticut), listed on the National Register of Historic Places (NRHP)
- Glenville School (Glenville, Nebraska), NRHP-listed
