= Glenville, Nova Scotia =

Glenville, Nova Scotia may refer to:

- Glenville, Cumberland County, Nova Scotia
- Glenville, Inverness County, Nova Scotia
