= Glennville =

Glennville may refer to:

- Glennville, California
- Glennville, Georgia
- Glennville, Pennsylvania, a place in Chester County

== See also ==
- Glenville (disambiguation)
- Glenvil, Nebraska
- Glenvil Township, Clay County, Nebraska
