= Bethel African Methodist Episcopal Church (Malvern, Arkansas) =

Historic church in Arkansas, United States

- Formerly listed on the U.S. National Register of Historic Places
- Location within Arkansas Location within the United States
- Location: 519 W. Page St., Malvern, Arkansas
- Coordinates: 34°21′35″N 92°48′58″W
- Area: less than one acre
- Built: 1916–1920
- Architect: Alfred W. Woods
- Architectural style: Late Gothic Revival
- NRHP reference No.: 04000496

Significant dates
- Added to NRHP: May 26, 2004
- Removed from NRHP: June 12, 2013

Bethel African Methodist Episcopal Church was a historic church at 519 W. Page St. in Malvern, Arkansas. The African Methodist Episcopal congregation in Malvern was founded in 1894 as St. Luke's African Methodist Episcopal Church. The congregation began plans for a new church building in 1916; the new building was designed by Alfred W. Woods in the Gothic Revival style. The church was completed in 1920. The congregation no longer used the building as a church, but the building was still considered an important landmark in the history of Malvern's African-American community.

The church was added to the National Register of Historic Places on May 26, 2004. It was delisted on June 12, 2013, following its demolition earlier in the year.
