= Guilbert and Betelle =

American architectural firm and designer of schools

Guilbert and Betelle was an architecture firm formed as a partnership of Ernest F. Guilbert and James Oscar Betelle. The firm specialized in design of schools on the East Coast of the United States, with an emphasis on the "Collegiate Gothic" style.

Betelle took over the firm after Guilbert died in 1916, and oversaw design of hundreds of schools, including Greenwich High School in Greenwich, Connecticut, and the Radburn School in Fair Lawn, New Jersey, both of which are listed on the National Register of Historic Places. Other notable buildings for which the firm was responsible include the Essex County Hall of Records and the Essex Club (now home of the New Jersey Historical Society).

== Structures ==
The following is a list of structures designed by the firm, ordered by state and locality:

=== Connecticut ===
- Glenville School (Greenwich, Connecticut) (NRHP-listed)
- Greenwich:

Cos Cob School, c. 1916
Greenwich High School (Greenwich Town Hall), c. 1925

- New Britain:

State Normal School (Davidson Hall, CCSU), c. 1922

=== Delaware ===
Pierre S. duPont Rural Schools, c. 1919-1921
William P. Bancroft School, c.1928
Charles B. Lore School ('Lorelton' assisted living home), c. 1932

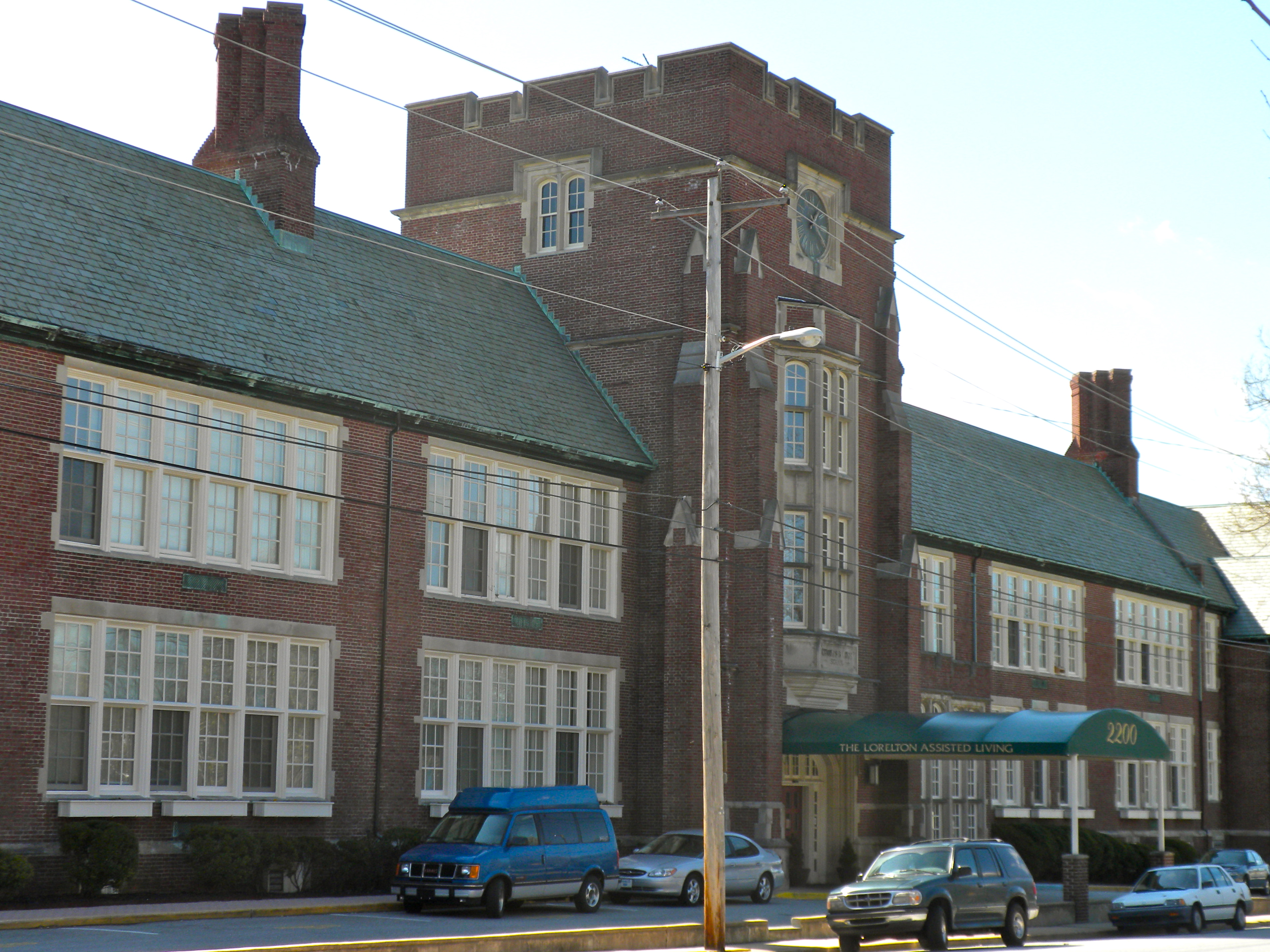
Charles Lore School, Wilmington, DE

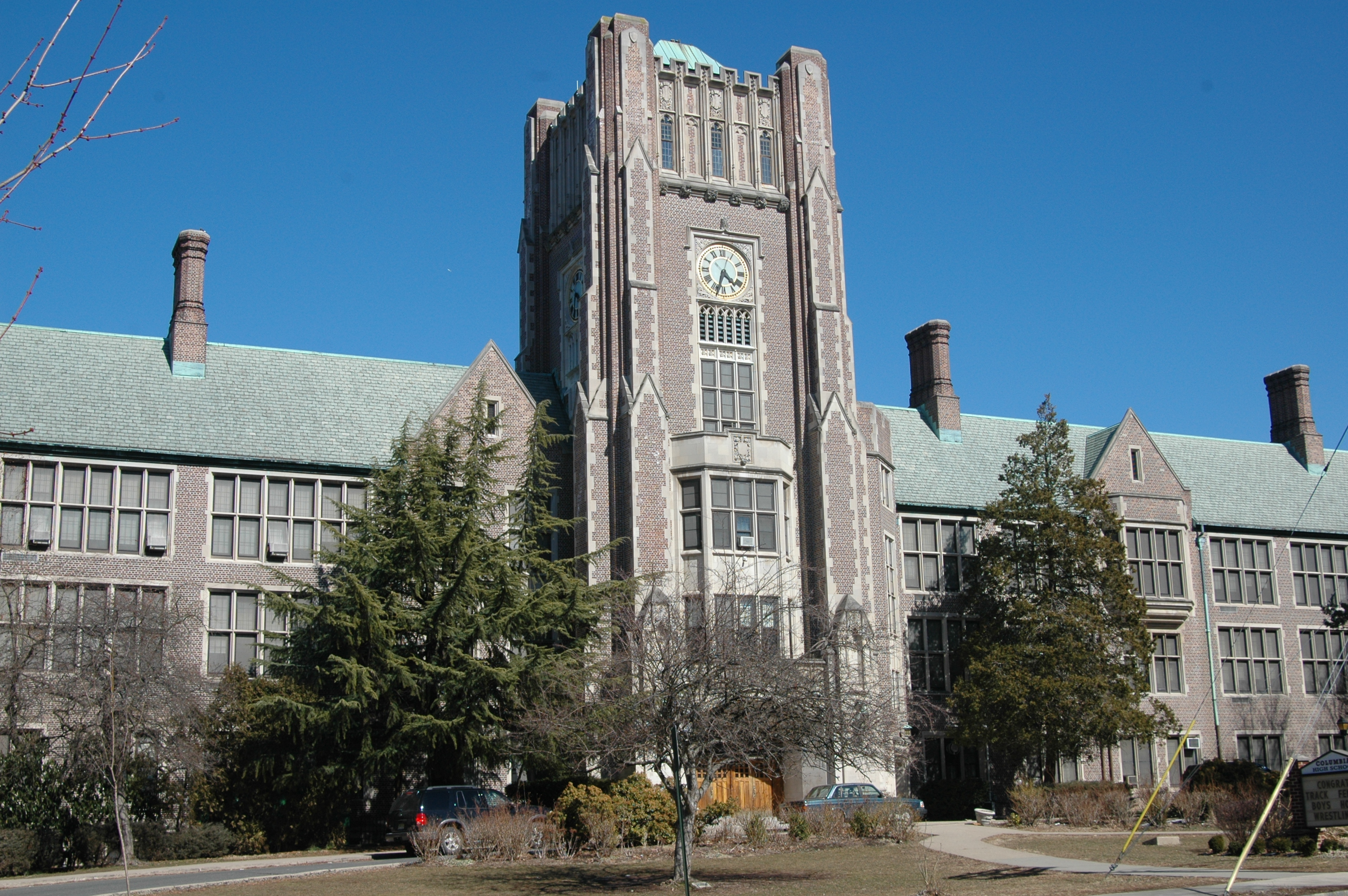
Columbia High School, Maplewood, New Jersey

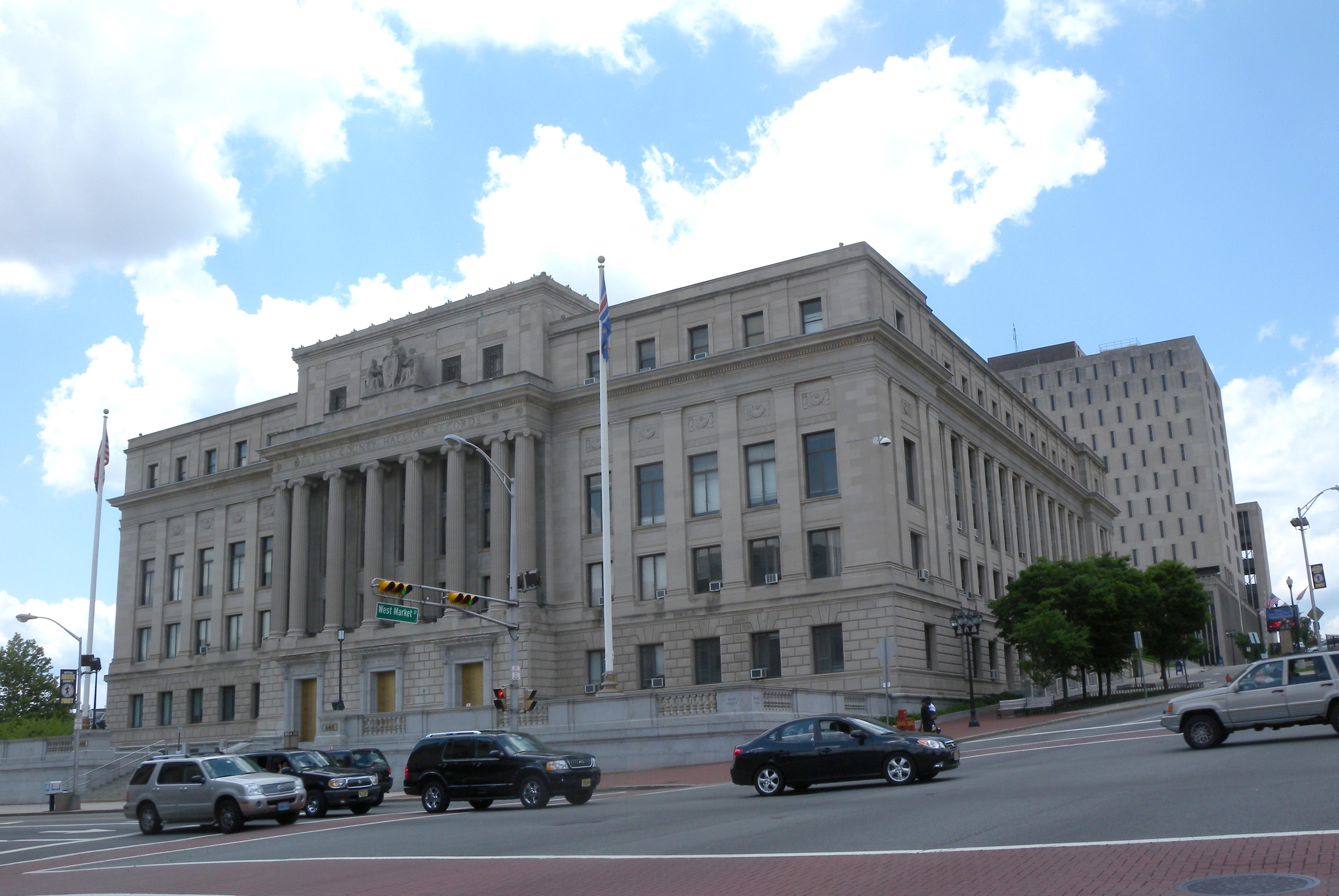
Essex County Hall of Records

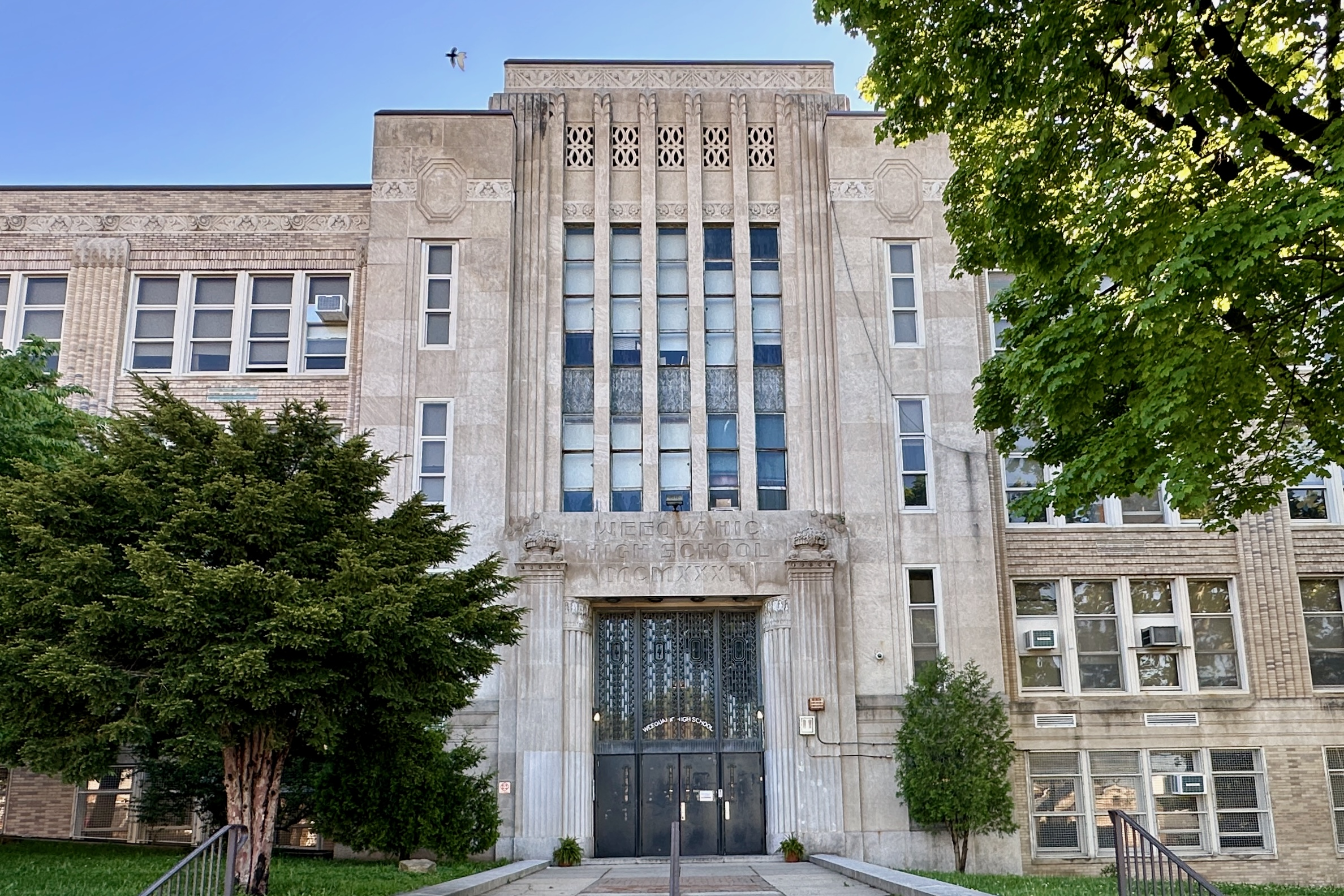
Weequahic High School, Newark, New Jersey

=== New Jersey ===
- East Orange:

East Orange High School (demolished), c. 1911

- Jersey City:

State Normal School at Jersey City, c. 1930

- Newark:

Newark Central High School, c. 1912
Chamber of Commerce Building, c. 1923
Cleveland School, c. 1913
East Side High School, c. 1911
The Essex Club (New Jersey Historical Society), c. 1926 (NRHP-listed)
Essex County Boys Vocational School, c. 1931
Essex County Girls Vocational School, c. 1930
Essex County Hall of Records, c. 1926
Home of Ernest F. Guilbert, c. 1910
Home of Franklin Murphy, Jr., c. 1925
Newark Normal School, c. 1913 (currently Technology High School)
Newark Public School of Fine and Industrial Arts, c. 1931
Ridge Street School, c. 1913
Robert Treat Hotel, c. 1916
South Side High School, c. 1913 (currently Malcolm X Shabazz High School)
Weequahic High School, c. 1932 (NRHP-listed)
West Side High School, c. 1926

- South Orange and Maplewood:

Clinton Elementary, c. 1929
Columbia High School, c. 1927
First Street School, c. 1924
Jefferson Elementary, c. 1924
Montrose Elementary, c. 1924
Maplewood Junior High, c.1930
Maplewood Municipal Building, c.1931
Marshall Elementary, c.1922
South Mountain Elementary, c.1929
Tuscan Elementary, c. 1924

- Summit:

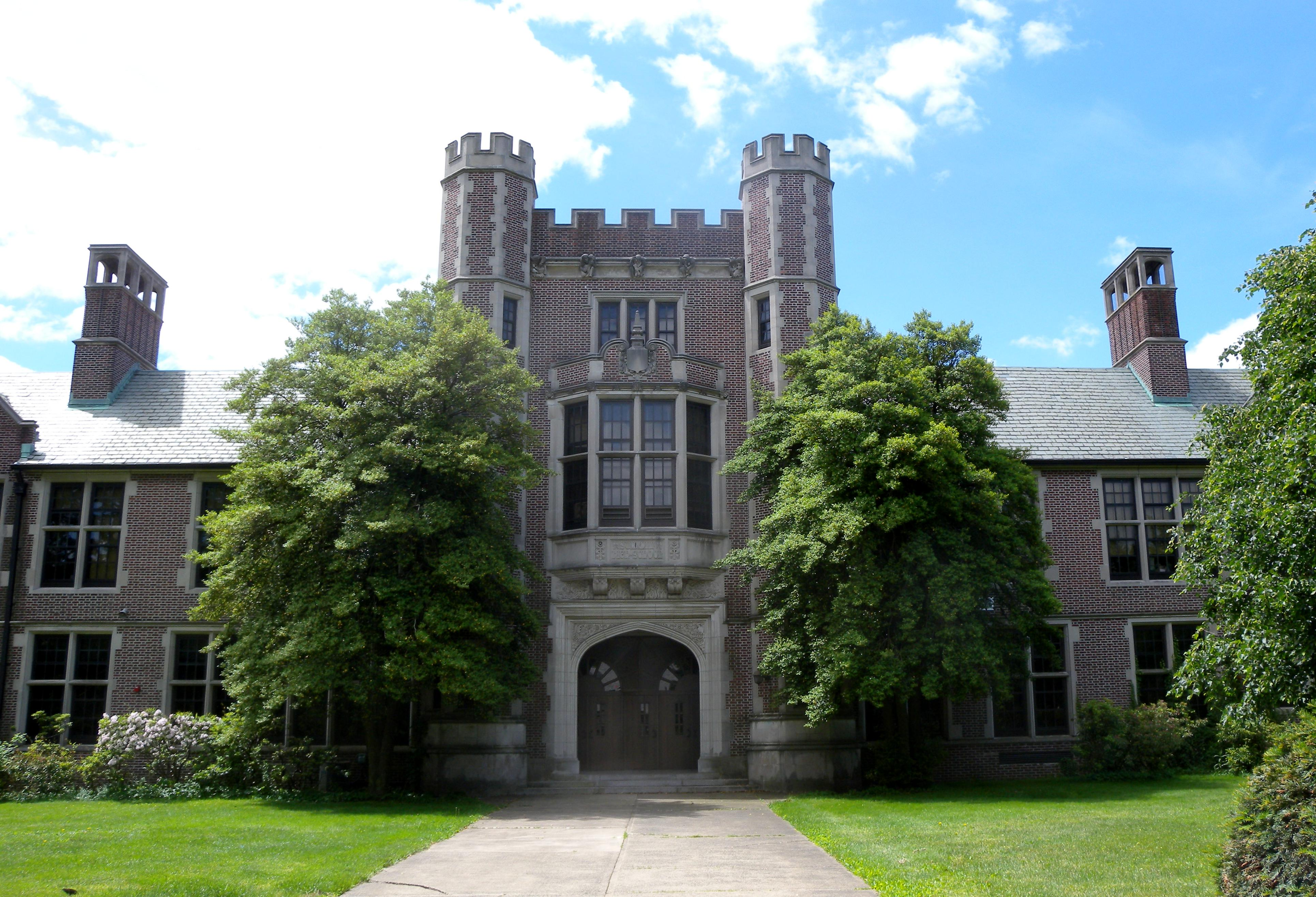
Summit High School

Franklin Elementary
Jefferson Elementary
Summit High School (Summit Middle School), c. 1923
Washington Elementary, c. 1931

- Vineland:

Vineland High School (the Landis School), c. 1927
Thomas A. Edison Jr. High, c. 1927

- West Orange

West Orange High School (Seton Hall Preparatory School)

=== New York ===
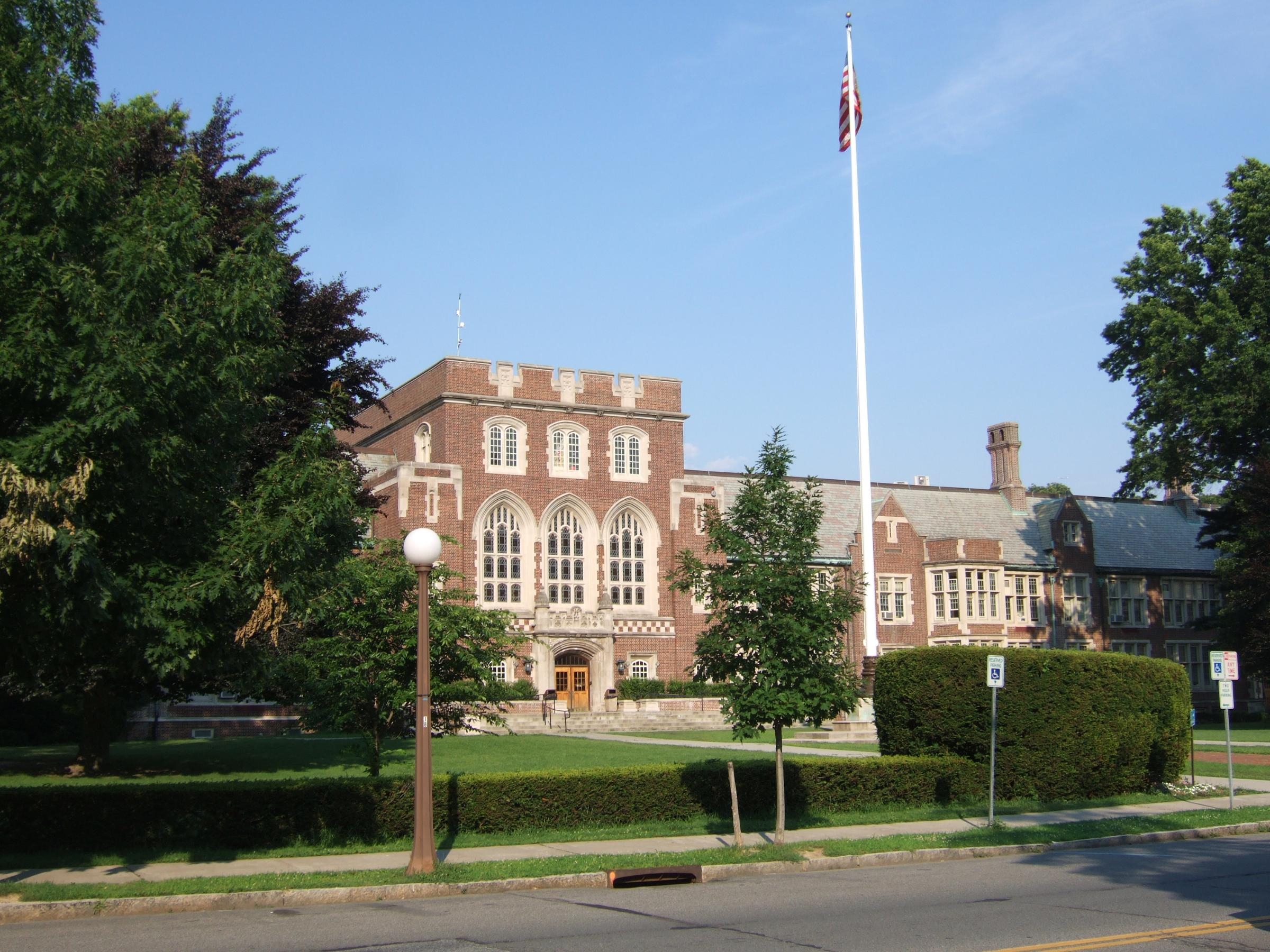
The Bronxville School in Bronxville, New York.

- Bronxville

The Bronxville School, c. 1930

- Great Neck

Great Neck High School, c. 1926

- New Rochelle

New Rochelle High School, c. 1926

- Tarrytown

Washington Irving School, c. 1925

=== Pennsylvania ===
- Williamsport:

Thaddeus Stevens Jr. High School, c. 1927
Science Hall, Lincoln University, c. 1925

=== NRHP-listed ===
Duplicative to the above, the buildings designed by these architects which survive and are listed on the National Register of Historic Places (NRHP) are:

- Essex Club, Address Restricted Newark NJ Guilbert & Betelle
- Glenville School (Greenwich, Connecticut), 449 Pemberwick Rd. Greenwich CT Betelle, James Oscar
- Iron Hill School No. 112C, 1335 Old Baltimore Pike, Pencader Hundred Newark DE Betelle, James Oscar
- Charles B. Lore Elementary School, Fourth St. and Woodlawn Ave. Wilmington DE Guilbert and Betelle
- One or more buildings in Military Park (Newark) Commons Historic District, Roughly bounded by Washington Pl., McCarter Hwy, E. Park St. and Raymond Blvd. Newark NJ Guilbert and Betelle
- New Jersey Manual Training and Industrial School for Colored Youth, N of Burlington Rd., W of I-295 Bordentown NJ Guilbert & Betelle
- Public School No. 111-C, DE 7 Christiana DE Betelle, James O.
- Ross Point School, Road 448 near Jct. with Road 62 Laurel DE Guilbert and Betelle
- Vineland High School, 61 W. Landis Ave. Vineland NJ Betelle, J.O.
