= William H. Charlton House =

- U.S. National Register of Historic Places
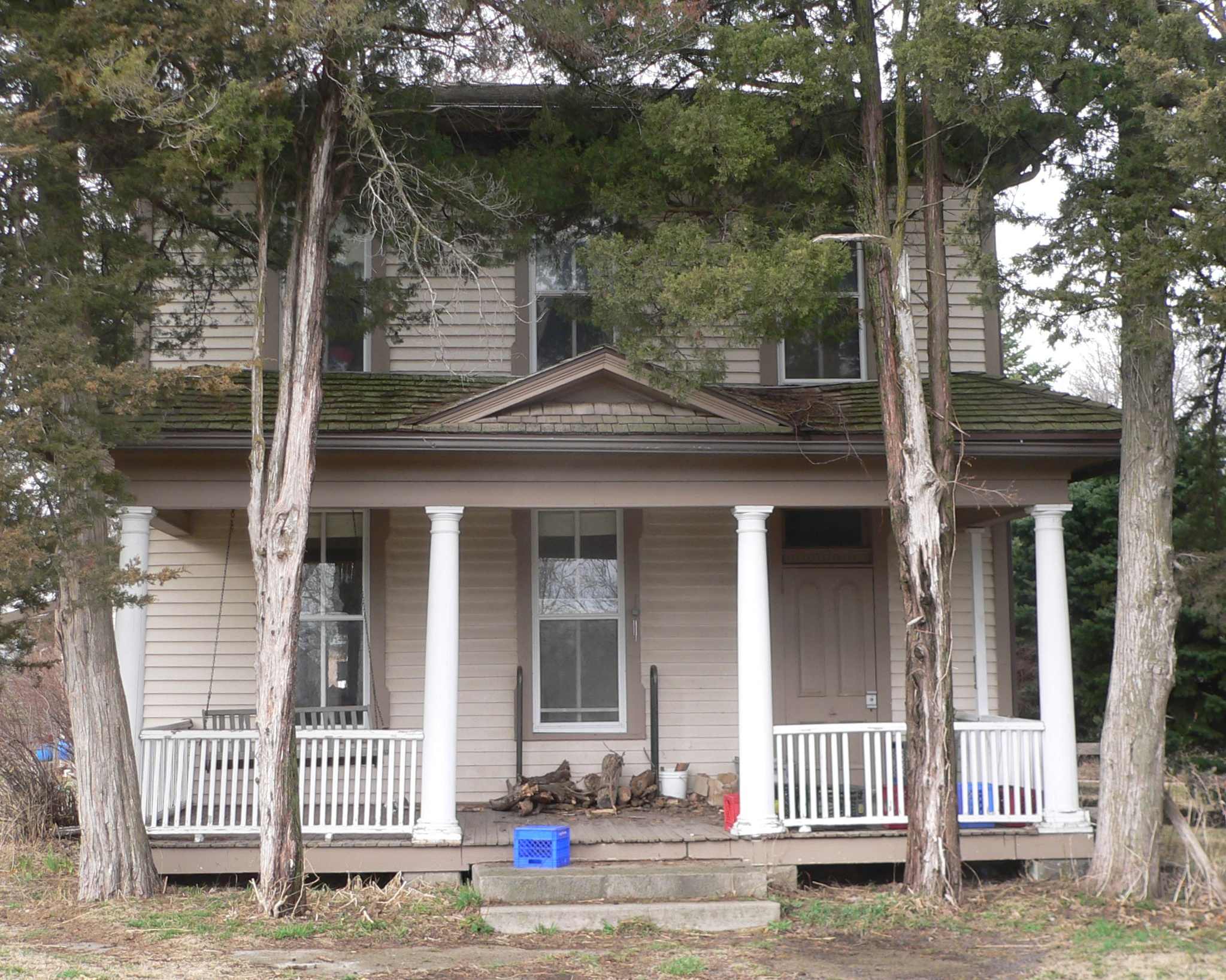
- The house in 2012

- Location within Nebraska Location within the United States
- Nearest city: Roca, Nebraska
- Coordinates: 40°38′13″N 96°42′21″W
- Area: less than one acre
- Built: 1872
- Architect: Artemas Roberts
- Architectural style: Italianate
- NRHP reference No.: 96001614
- Added to NRHP: January 25, 1997

The William H. Charlton House is a historic two-story house in Roca, Nebraska. It was built in 1872 for farmer William H. Charlton, and designed by architect Artemas Roberts in the Italianate style, with "characteristic tall proportions, emphatic porch, decorative window surrounds, and bracketed eaves." Charlton lived here with his wife, née Mary E. Lidolph, and their three children, and he became a widower in 1877; he later married Phoebe Adelaide Thornton. The house has been listed on the National Register of Historic Places since January 25, 1997.
