= Edna Work Hall =

- U.S. National Register of Historic Places
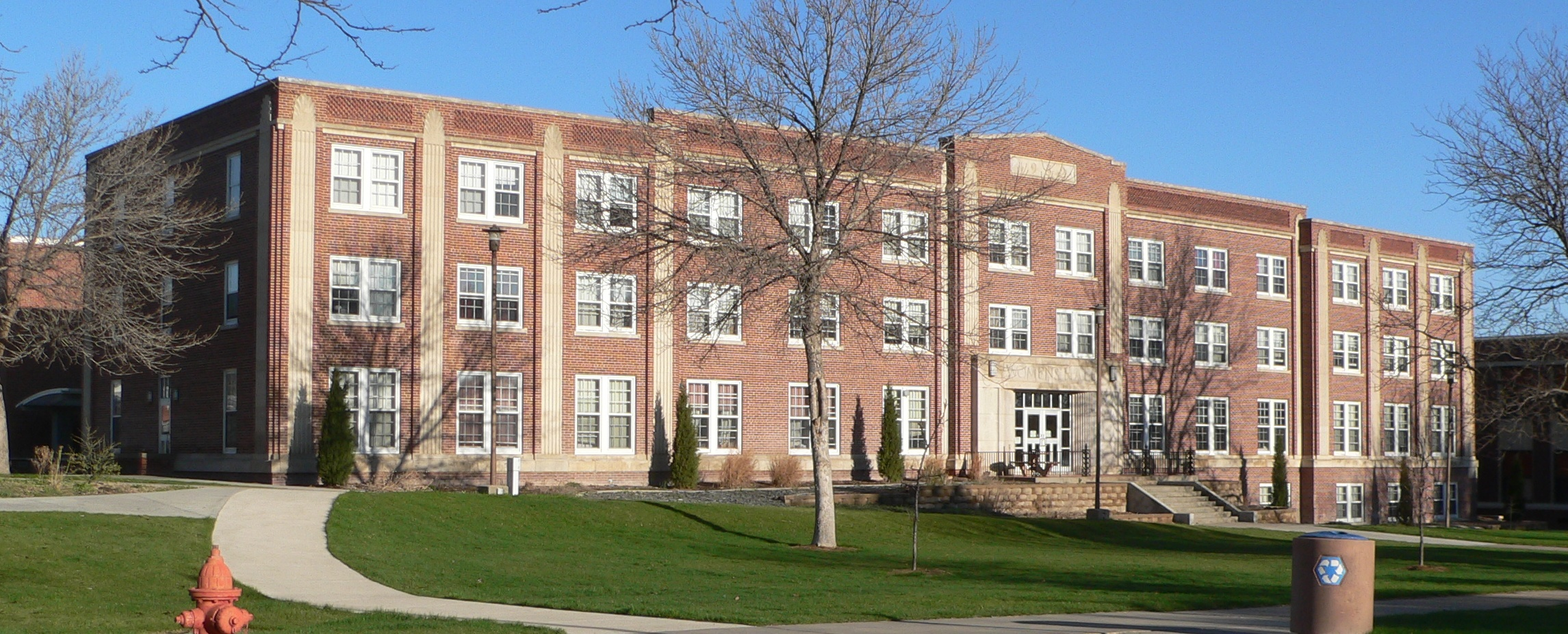

- Location within Nebraska Location within the United States
- Location: 10th and Main Sts., Chadron, Nebraska
- Coordinates: 42.820556°N 103.001944°W
- Area: less than one acre
- Built: 1932
- Architect: Arthur D. Baker
- Architectural style: Art Deco
- MPS: Chadron State College Historic Buildings TR
- NRHP reference No.: 83001087
- Added to NRHP: September 8, 1983

Edna Work Hall, also known as Women's Hall, on the campus of Chadron State College in Chadron, Nebraska, was built in 1932 and was listed on the National Register of Historic Places in 1983.

It was designed by architect Arthur D. Baker. It was expanded at the rear in 1960.

It was built to serve as a women's dormitory and replaced 1914-built Sparks Hall in that role. It was renamed for Edna E. Work (1881-1950) who served as Dean of Women from 1916 until 1947, and who helped plan and design this building, first named Women's Hall.
