= Iron Hill School No. 112C =

Historic schoolhouse in Delaware, US

- U.S. National Register of Historic Places
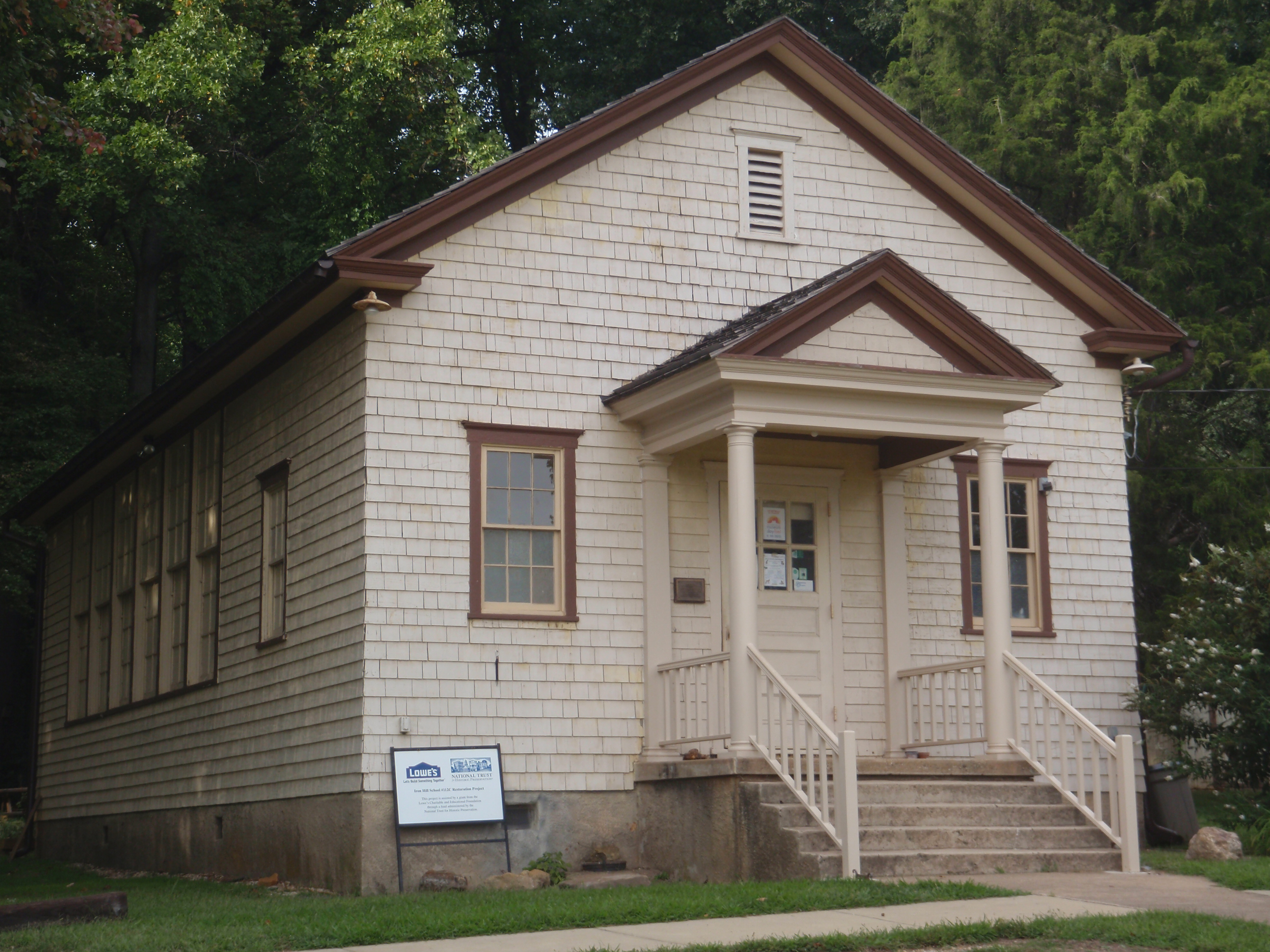
- Iron Hill School, September 2012

- Location within Delaware Location within the United States
- Location: 1335 Old Baltimore Pike in Pencader Hundred, near Newark, Delaware
- Coordinates: 39.631532°N 75.758182°W
- Area: 2 acres (0.81 ha)
- Built: 1923
- Architect: Betelle, James Oscar
- Architectural style: Colonial Revival
- NRHP reference No.: 95001032
- Added to NRHP: August 18, 1995

Iron Hill School No. 112C, also known as the Iron Hill Museum, is a historic one-room school building located near Newark in New Castle County, Delaware, United States. It was built in 1923 and is an example of schools for African American children built in the 1920s by Progressive Era philanthropist Pierre S. du Pont (1870–1954).

== Building ==
The school is 1 1/2-story, rectangular frame, wood-shingled building on a concrete foundation with a medium-pitched gable roof. The building measures 24 feet by 48 feet, and features a pedimented portico centered on the gable end in the Colonial Revival style. The current building is largely unchanged from its original form.

== History ==
In the 1920s, Pierre S. du Pont funded the building of a number of schools built for minority students. Delaware schools buildings at the time were outdated, and very few new buildings had been built since the turn of the century. Buildings for black and Native American students were particularly insufficient. Du Pont visited schools himself and saw children attempting to study in crowded, unsanitary buildings with very little teaching equipment.

A school was opened in the area in the late 1870s, though attendance was poor, and it was not open at all in the 1918–1919 school year. A new building may have been constructed in 1904. The existing building at the time the new school was built measured 14 feet (4.3 m) by 16 feet (4.9 m) and served around 30 pupils in 1901 and 1910.

The school was designed by architect James Oscar Betelle and built in 1923 on land given to the State Board of Education by the Whittaker Iron Company.

Education was provided for grades 1 through 6 by a single teacher, as in most black Delaware schools through the 1940s. Attendance improve significantly after construction of the new building, and attending children wrote letters to Du Pont thanking him for the school in 1926. The school was used until school segregation was abolished, which occurred at Iron Hill in 1965. After it was closed, it was used for exhibitions by the Delaware Academy of Science, which purchased the building in 1973.

The building was added to the National Register of Historic Places in 1995.

The school now houses the Iron Hill Museum, part of the Iron Hill Science Center. Its exhibits include area iron ore mining, Lenni Lenape history and culture, rocks and minerals from around Delaware and around the world, mounted area wildlife, and a display of fossils found in the state.

In 2017, the museum began to host powwows. In 2021, it opened an African American History Trail to explore the history of the school and the local community, which has been repeatedly vandalized.
