= Valentine Public School =

- U.S. National Register of Historic Places
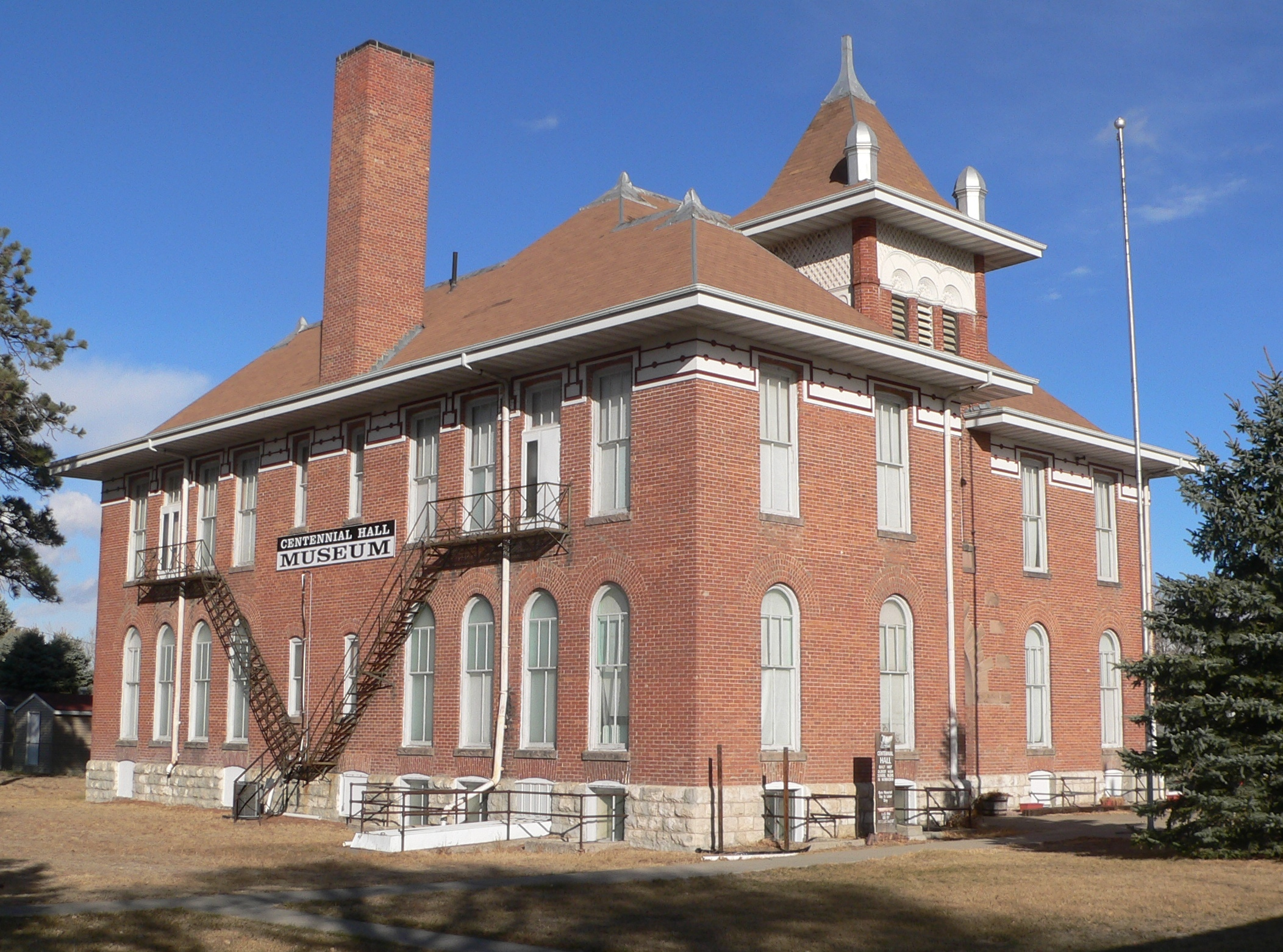

- Location within Nebraska Location within the United States
- Location: 3rd and Macomb Sts., Valentine, Nebraska
- Coordinates: 42°52′31″N 100°32′48″W
- Area: less than one acre
- Built: 1897
- Built by: Beindorff, Charles F.; Fletcher & Stolze
- Architectural style: Queen Anne, Romanesque
- NRHP reference No.: 84002454
- Added to NRHP: June 14, 1984

The Valentine Public School, at 3rd and Macomb Sts. in Valentine, Nebraska, was built in 1897. It has also been known as Centennial Hall.

== History and significance ==
It was deemed significant for listing on the National Register of Historic Places, in 1984, as being a relatively rare example of a school used for first grade through high school, originally, and for its Queen Anne style "character combined with Romanesque Revival elements".

It was listed on the National Register of Historic Places in 1984.

== Present day ==
It is now operated as a museum, the Centennial Hall Museum.

Two other Nebraska schools that combined elementary and high schools and are listed on the National Register are the 1903-built Glenville School and the Steele City School, both in southeastern Nebraska.
