= Sparks Hall =

- U.S. National Register of Historic Places
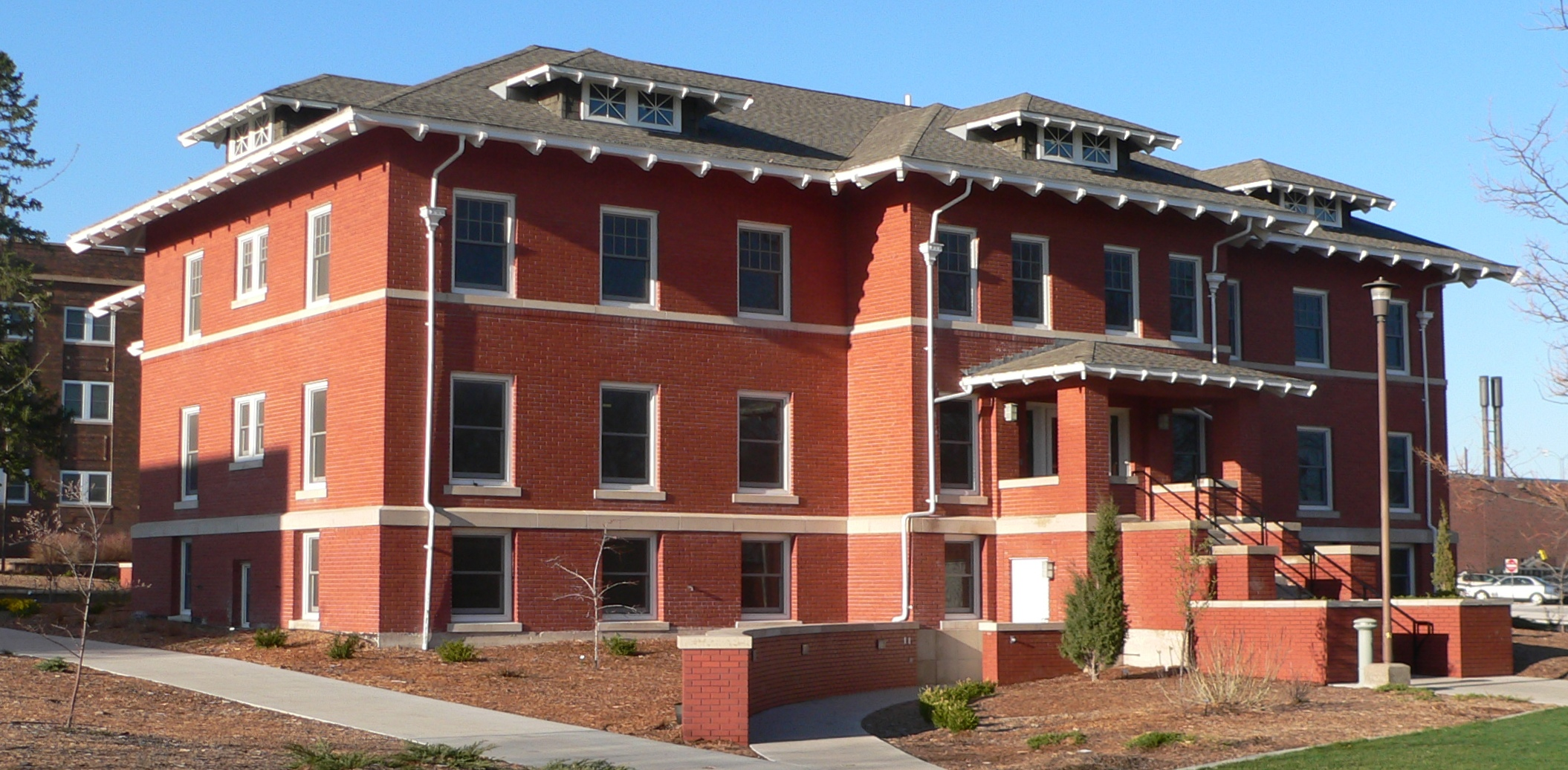

- Location within Nebraska Location within the United States
- Location: 10th and Main Sts., Chadron, Nebraska
- Coordinates: 42.819722°N 103.0°W
- Area: less than one acre
- Built: 1914
- Architect: Alfred W. Woods
- Architectural style: Colonial Revival
- MPS: Chadron State College Historic Buildings TR
- NRHP reference No.: 83001086
- Added to NRHP: September 8, 1983

Sparks Hall, also known as Women's Dormitory on the campus of Chadron State College in Chadron, Nebraska, was built in 1914 and was listed on the National Register of Historic Places in 1983.

It was designed by Lincoln, Nebraska, architect Alfred W. Woods. It is a two-story wood-frame building with red brick veneer, on a raised basement. It has a one-story covered porch.

It was the second building on the campus and served as the women's dormitory from 1914 to 1932 or 1933, when it was replaced in that role by Edna Work Hall. It was then renamed "Sparks Hall", named for Joseph Sparks, the first president of the college, and began serving as the men's dormitory.
