= New Mill and Depot Building, Hawthorne Woolen Mill =

- U.S. National Register of Historic Places
- U.S. Historic district – Contributing property
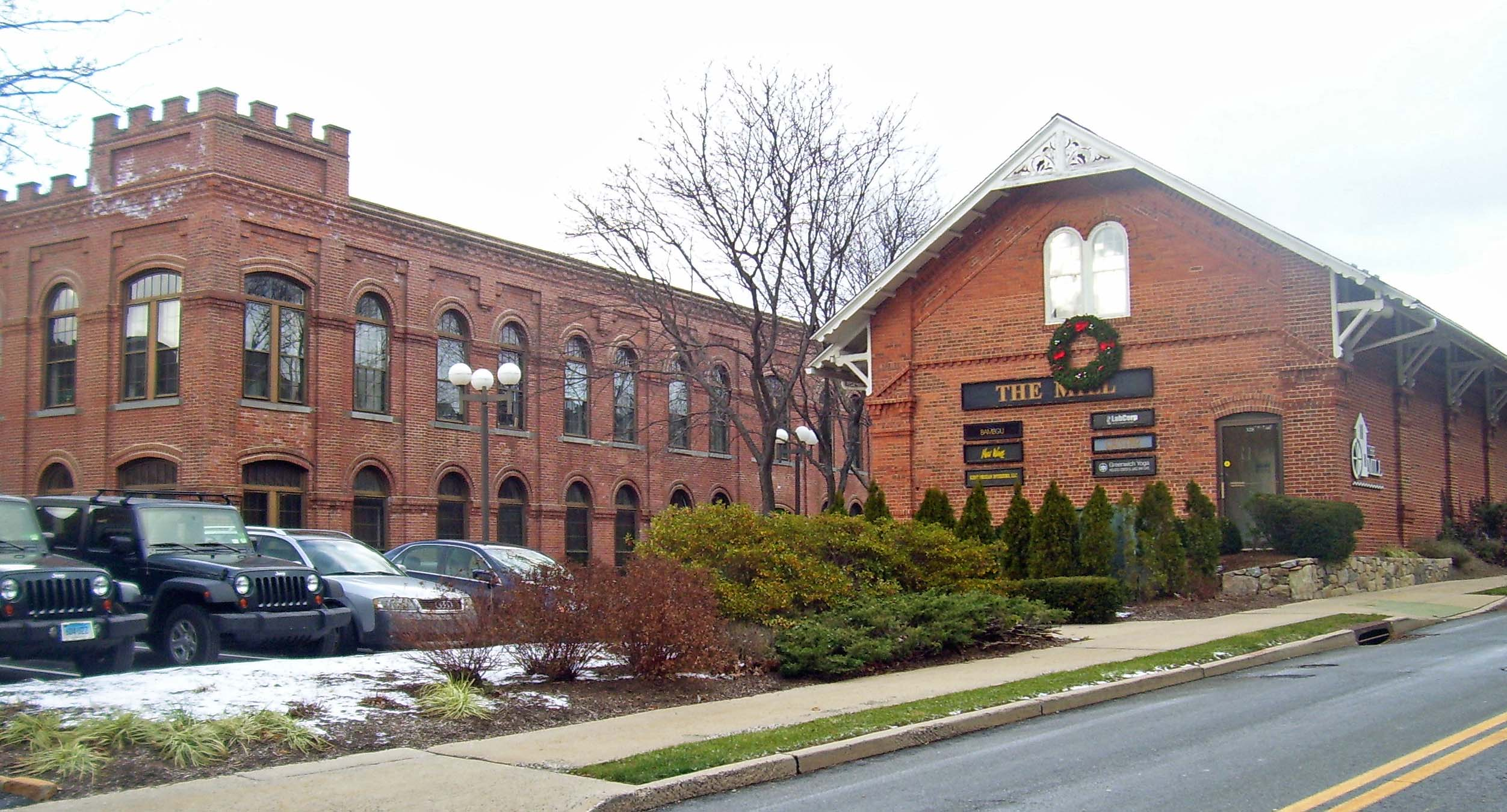
- South elevation and east profile, 2008

- Location within Connecticut Location within the United States
- Location: Greenwich, CT
- Coordinates: 41°2′11″N 73°39′57″W
- Area: 0.8 acres (3,200 m^{2})
- Built: 1875
- Architectural style: Queen Anne, Gothic Revival
- NRHP reference No.: 90000152
- Added to NRHP: February 23, 1990

The New Mill and Depot Building of the former Hawthorne Woolen Mill are located in Greenwich, Connecticut, United States. The two structures were built on an existing textile mill complex in the 1870s.

The mill and its depot, in the Gothic Revival and Queen Anne architectural styles respectively, were unusually decorative for functional buildings of that era. Today they are a commercial and retail complex for the Glenville neighborhood of Greenwich. In 1990 they were listed on the National Register of Historic Places. Thirteen years later, when the Glenville Historic District was listed on the Register in 2003, the buildings were a contributing property.

== Buildings ==
The two structures are located on a 0.8-acre (0.32 ha) lot between Pemberwick Road on the west and the Byram River on the east, where the 30-foot-high (9.1 m) dam that powered the mills is still present. To the north is the commercial center of Greenwich's Glenville neighborhood, with the large former Glenville School, now the Western Greenwich Civic Center, to the east, behind a housing development. On the west side of the street the land rises sharply through wooded bluffs to a residential neighborhood; another one is on the other side of the river, where the land rises more gently to the state line and Rye Brook, New York, a half-mile (1 km) away. To the south Pemberwick continues through woods along the Byram.

The "new" mill building, the larger of the two, sits on the river. It is a three-story, 56-by-156-foot (17 by 48 m) brick building with a two-story 19-by-46-foot (5.8 by 14.0 m) northern wing. Because of a regrading it now appears to be two stories on the east. A central tower rises to a fourth story, its top 55 feet (17 m) above the ground.

Intricate brickwork and decoration characterizes all the main block's facades. The round-arched windows on both floors have as their springlines belt courses made of three rows of brick laid as two rows of headers with black stretchers in between. This is complemented by a reverse in the arches themselves, where the black bricks are recessed. Pilasters rise between the windows, topped by squares of projecting brick. A dentilled cornice runs just below the roofline.

The tower, and all but the east roofline, are crenelated at the top. Additionally machicolation supports the flared top of the tower. Diapered brick spells out "1881", the year of construction, in one of the entablatures. Smaller towers are located at the corners of the building.

A pedestrian plaza separates the mill building from the 30-by-123-foot (9.1 by 37.5 m) depot to the east. It is a one-and-a-half-story structure of brick, in less decorative patterns. Its gabled roof has broad overhanging eaves pierced by gabled dormer windows on the west. Both the dormer gables and the braces at the main gable peaks are braced with wood in a lacy foliate pattern, more intricate at the gable peaks than the dormers. The latter have visible rafter ends.

== History ==
Glenville had grown up around a mill on the Byram since first being settled in the mid-18th century. By 1814 at the latest a textile mill, the Byram Manufacturing Company, had been established at the present site. It went through a variety of owners over the next several decades, none of them able to make it successful in the long term.

After an 1874 foreclosure, William Tingue of Paterson, New Jersey, purchased the mill. He formed Tingue, Hous and Company, doing business as Hawthorne Woolen Mill. An insurance survey done in 1875 notes that the buildings were "substantial and in good repair"; it is not known then why he chose to demolish and replace them within a few years.

The depot, probably the first of the two to be built, was to have been served by a railroad, shown as planned on 1867 maps, connecting Port Chester, New York, and Ridgefield, Connecticut. Those plans were eventually abandoned. The construction of the new mill, which replaced a building described by the 1875 insurance survey as similar in size, suggests that Tingue had been able to make the mill very profitable.

His success may also have led him to choose such high-style designs for the buildings, to show the importance of the mills to the community and his commitment to them, as owners of such buildings at the time sometimes did. The intricate patterning on the mill facade suggests a great deal of thought went into the composition; the woodwork trim on the depot shows a Stick/Eastlake influence.

In 1892 the company changed its name to the Hawthorne Mills Company. Five years later, in 1897, it was recorded as operating with 20 sets of cards and 70 broadlooms. The American Felt Company, a New Jersey–based concern that operated mills in four states, acquired Hawthorne in 1899.

Its success continued, with first Irish and later Polish immigrants who lived nearby staffing the mills. In 1939 it had 24 card sets, five pickers and 200 employees total. After World War II it went into decline along with the New England textile industry as a whole.

American Felt closed the mill in the 1970s. It has since been converted into a residential and commercial complex. The interiors of the buildings were completely renovated and partitioned, but the exteriors remain relatively intact.

== See also ==
- National Register of Historic Places listings in Greenwich, Connecticut
