= New Jersey Historical Society =

Coordinates: 40.73887°N 74.16868°W

- Essex Club
- U.S. National Register of Historic Places
- New Jersey Register of Historic Places
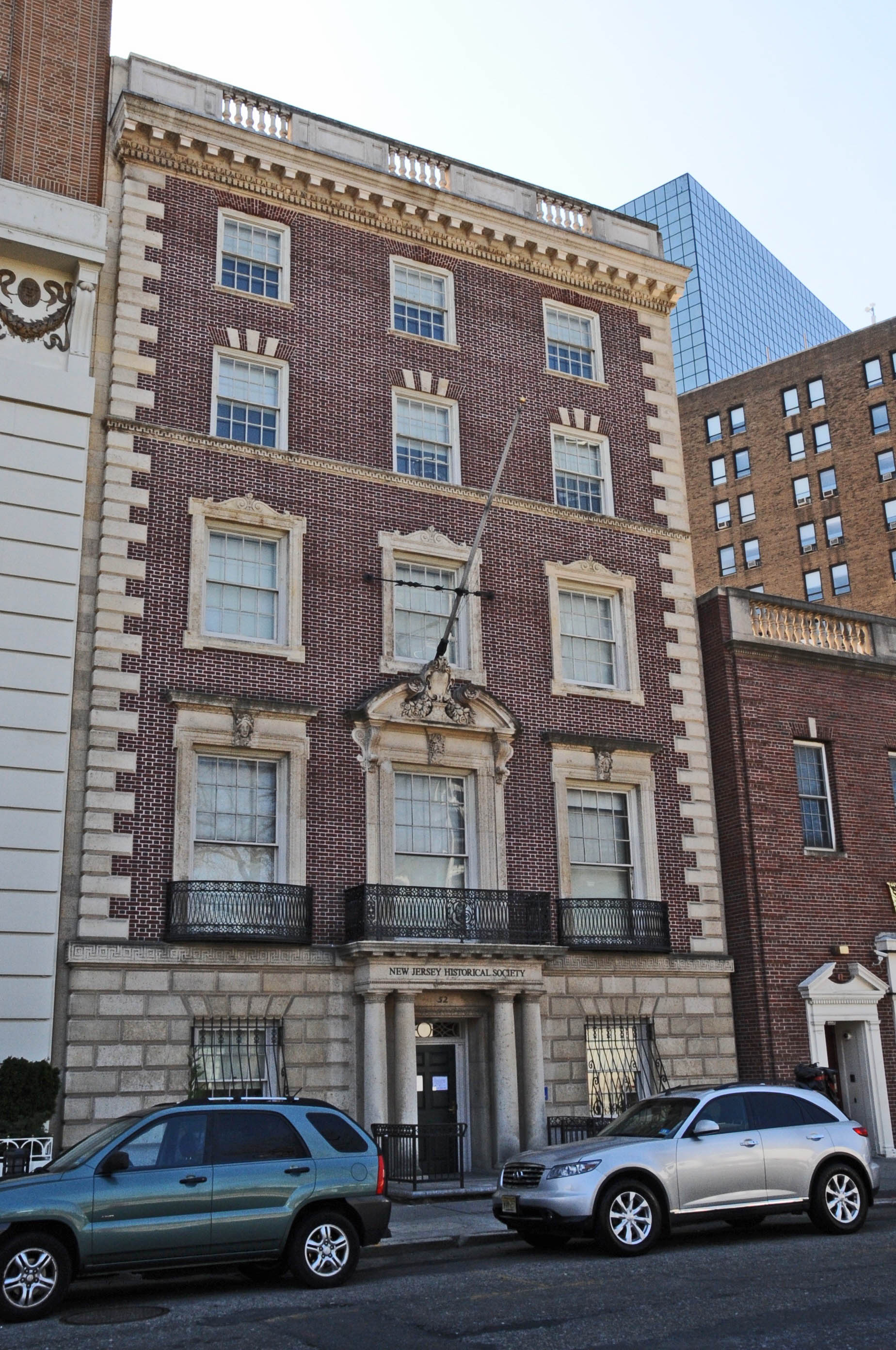
- Essex Club, current location of the NJ Historical Society

- Location within Essex County, New Jersey Location within New Jersey Location within the United States
- Location: 52 Park Place; Newark, New Jersey
- Area: 0.2 acres (0.081 ha)
- Built: 1926
- Architect: Guilbert and Betelle
- Architectural style: Colonial Revival, Georgian Revival
- NRHP reference No.: 91000110
- NJRHP No.: 1245

Significant dates
- Added to NRHP: February 22, 1991
- Designated NJRHP: January 14, 1991

The New Jersey Historical Society is a historical society and museum located in Newark, New Jersey, United States. The Historical Society is housed in the former headquarters of the Essex Club. It has two floors of exhibition space, a gift shop, and a hall for lectures. The NJHS offers occasional Newark walking tours. The Society formerly published the academic journal, New Jersey History.

Exhibitions can be found on the second and third floor while the library reading room is housed on the fifth floor, formerly the Essex Club squash courts

The Society is open to the public. Members are free, while non-members pay an admission fee. Patrons visiting the library are encouraged to make an appointment. The current director is Steven Tettamanti.

== History ==
The society was founded in 1845 at Trenton by intellectual and business leaders of New Jersey including Joseph C. Hornblower, Robert Gibbon Johnson, Peter D. Vroom and William A. Whitehead. In 1846, the society relocated to Newark and has been there ever since.

Its original headquarters in Newark were located on Market Street. In 1931 it left Downtown Newark for a large colonial-style building partially paid for by Louis Bamberger at 230 Broadway, east of Branch Brook Park.

In 1997 the Historical Society returned downtown, to 52 Park Place, on Military Park. The new home is a Georgian style building vacated by the Essex Club that was designed by Guilbert & Betelle. The building was built in 1926 and had been added to the National Register of Historic Places on February 22, 1991. In its first year in the downtown location visits increased almost fivefold.

== See also ==
- Newark Museum
- Newark Public Library
- List of historical societies in New Jersey
- National Register of Historic Places listings in Essex County, New Jersey
- New Jersey Historical Trust
- Jewish Museum of New Jersey
- John T. Cunningham
