= Glenville Historic District =

Historic district in Connecticut, United States

- U.S. National Register of Historic Places
- U.S. Historic district
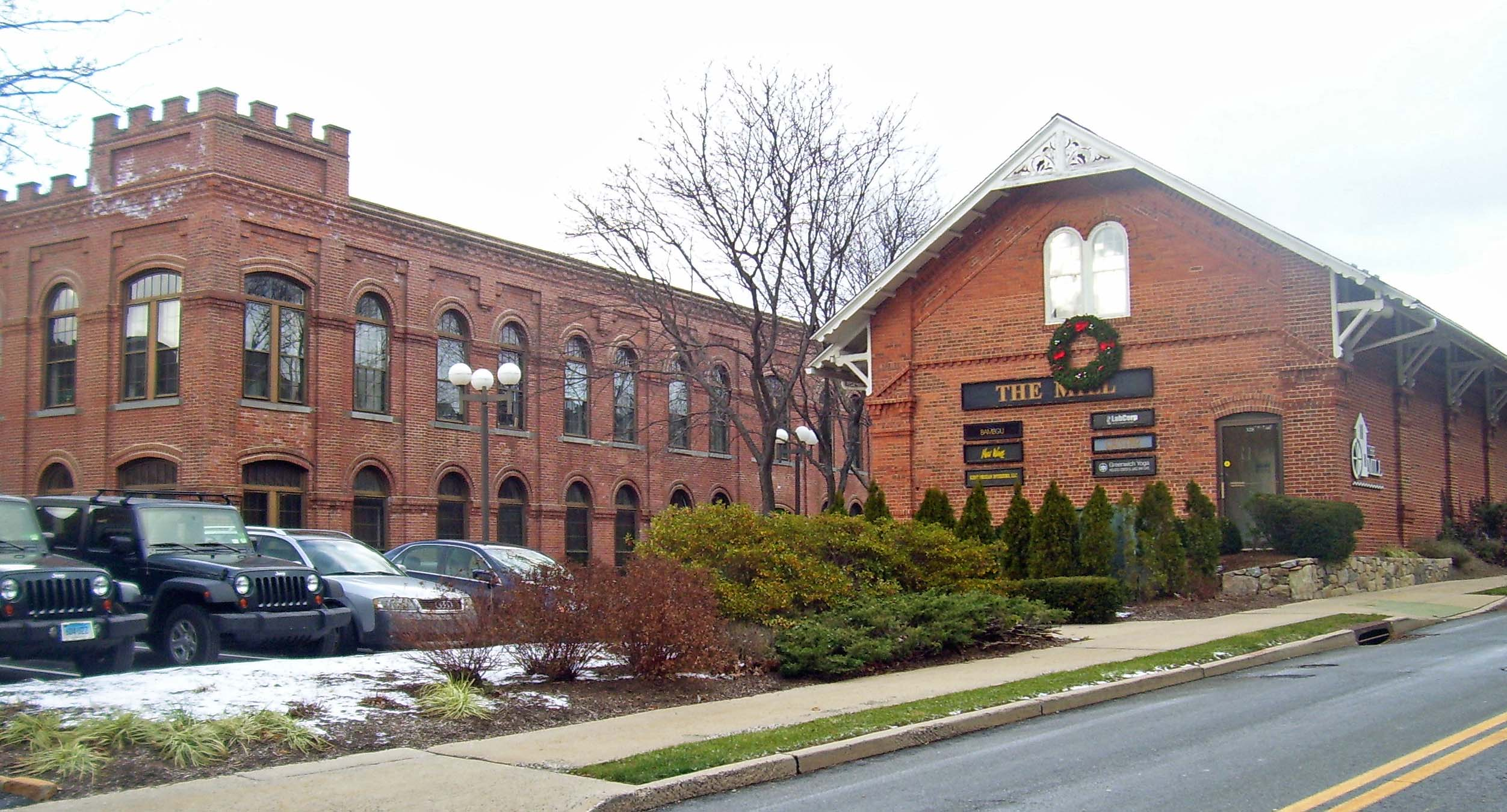
- The New Mill and Depot buildings

- Location within Connecticut Location within the United States
- Location: Roughly along Glen Ridge Road, Glenville Road, Glenville Street, Pemberwick Road, Riversville Road, and Weaver Street, Greenwich, Connecticut
- Coordinates: 41.03819°N 73.66498°W
- Area: 33.9 acres (13.7 ha)
- Architectural style: Mid 19th Century Revival, Late Victorian
- NRHP reference No.: 07000107
- Added to NRHP: March 9, 2007

Glenville Historic District, also known as Sherwood's Bridge, is a 33.9 acres (13.7 ha) historic district in the Glenville neighborhood of the town of Greenwich, Connecticut. It is the "most comprehensive example of a New England mill village within the Town of Greenwich". It "is also historically significant as one of the town's major staging areas of immigrants, predominantly Irish in the 19th century and Polish in the 20th century" and remains "the primary settlement of Poles in the town". Further, "[t]he district is architecturally significant because it contains two elaborate examples of mill construction, designed in the Romanesque Revival and a transitional Stick-style/Queen Anne; an excellent example of a Georgian Revival school; and notable examples of domestic and commercial architecture, including a Queen Anne mansion and an Italianate store building."

It was listed on the National Register of Historic Places in 2007. At that time, it included 43 contributing buildings, 4 other contributing structures, and 4 contributing sites.

The district is drawn to include the core area of the neighborhood, and it includes a mill property, although it omits an adjacent condominium complex. It is drawn also to exclude "a shopping center and the one-family houses of Angelus Drive, both areas dating from the 1960s." It also excludes various other commercial and residential areas of Glenville.

Significant properties in the district include:

- One Glenville Street, "the most notable commercial building in the district, the result of an 1882 expansion of a smaller building in the Italianate style"
- the Glenville School, which is separately listed on the NRHP
- Cornell's Castle, a Queen Anne style mansion (see accompanying photo #8)
- New Mill building, built in 1881 in Romanesque Revival style with corbelled battlements, dentil courses, pilasters, and other details (see photo #9)
- Depot Building, aka Picking Building, a "transitional Stick style/Queen Anne design" building constructed in 1879 anticipating a railroad that was never built (see photo #10)
- Webster Haight House, 1872 Italianate house, 25 Glenville Street
- Pottgen House, 1898, Queen Anne style house, 9 Glenville Street
- Glenville Firehouse, 1950, Georgian Revival, 266 Glenville Road
- a concrete arch bridge, from 1948, on Glenville Street
- 11 Glenville Street, an Italianate house built in 1855 and expanded by John Sherwood in 1882

It is located at falls of the Byram River, which provided waterpower when this was a mill village.

== See also ==
- National Register of Historic Places listings in Greenwich, Connecticut
