= William Jennings Bryan House (Lincoln, Nebraska) =

Historic house in Nebraska, United States

- U.S. National Register of Historic Places
- U.S. National Historic Landmark
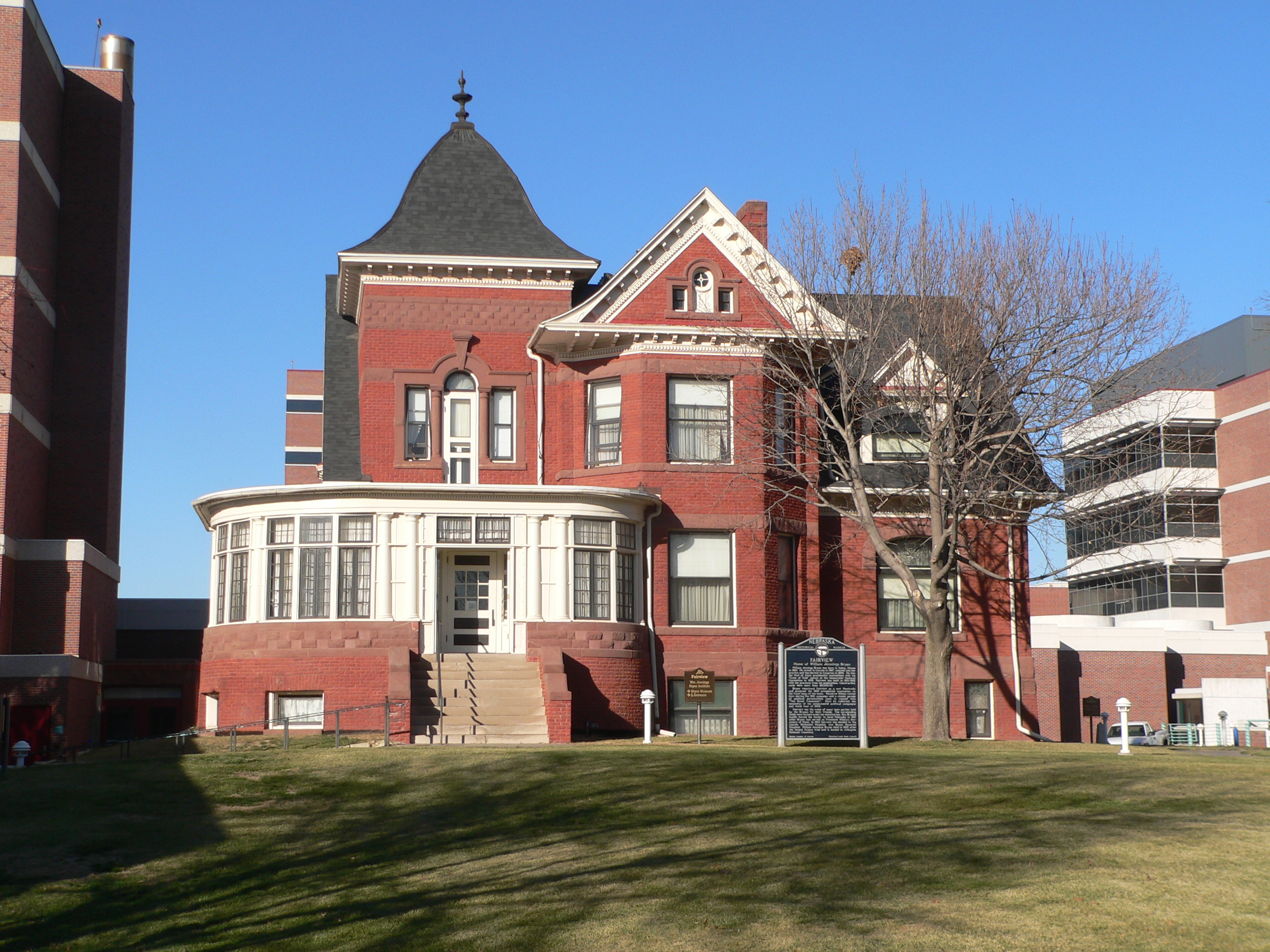
- Fairview, seen from the south. The buildings on either side are part of Bryan Medical Center.

- Location within Nebraska Location within the United States
- Location: 5163 A St., Lincoln, Nebraska
- Coordinates: 40°47′44.9″N 96°39′5.9″W
- Area: less than one acre
- Built: 1902–1903
- Architect: Artemus A. Roberts
- Architectural style: Classical Revival, Queen Anne
- NRHP reference No.: 66000947

Significant dates
- Added to NRHP: October 15, 1966
- Designated NHL: November 6, 1963

The William Jennings Bryan House, also known as Fairview, is a historic house museum on A Street in Lincoln, Nebraska, United States. Built in 1902–1903, it is noteworthy as the home of politician William Jennings Bryan (1860–1925), and was declared a National Historic Landmark in 1963. It is located on the Bryan Health hospital campus, and houses museum displays related to Bryan on the ground floor and the William Jennings Bryan Institute on the upper floors.

== Description and history ==
The William Jennings Bryan House is located on the corner of 52nd and A Streets on the Bryan Health campus. It originally stood on the north side of Sumner Street opposite South 50th Street. The house is a brick building, 1 1/2 stories in height, with a combination of Classical Revival and Queen Anne Victorian styling. It has the varied rooflines typical of the latter style, including a two-story square turret at the right front corner, topped by a slightly bellcast pyramidal roof with flared edges. Window sizes and shapes are also varied, with a small Palladian window in one gable section, and a larger one on the second level of the tower.

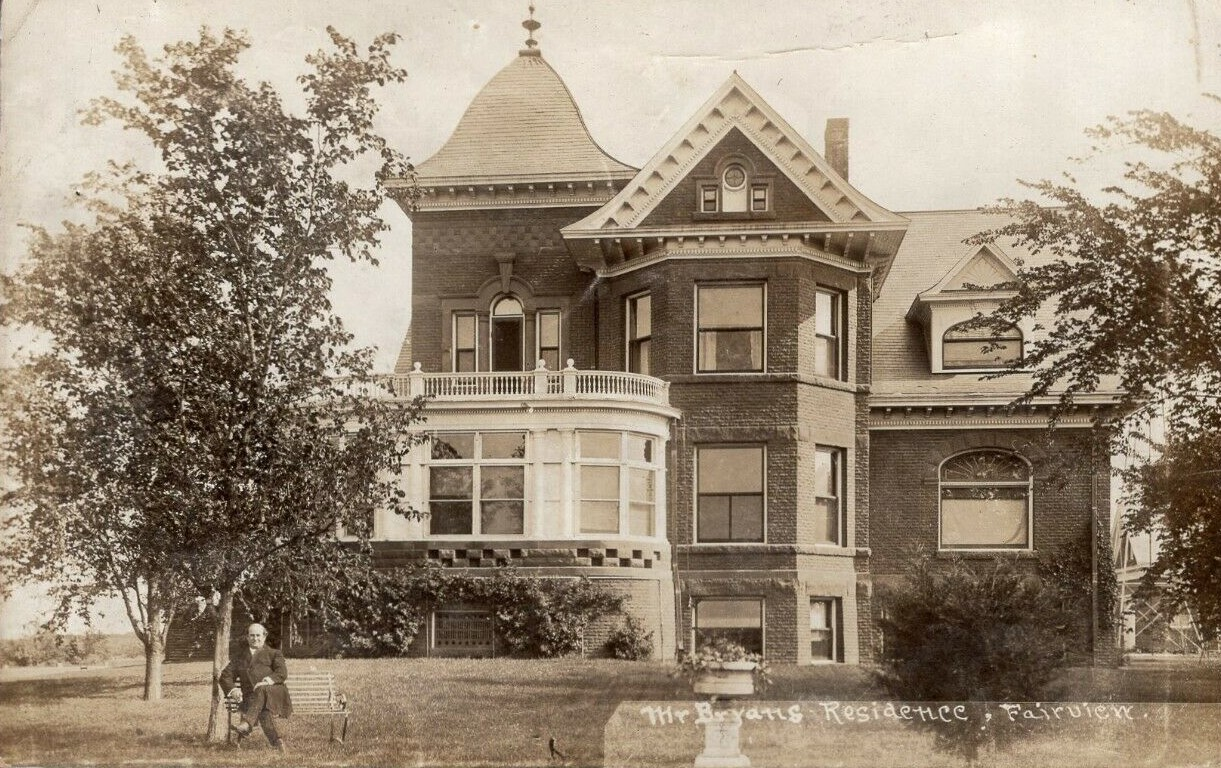
Fairview, Lincoln, NE c. 1910

The house was built in 1902 to a design by Artemus A. Roberts, and is a high-quality example of what was at the time a popular style in Lincoln. It was built for William Jennings Bryan, a Democratic Party politician then at the height of his influence. He was three times an unsuccessful candidate for President of the United States (in 1896, 1900, and 1908), and gave the influential Cross of Gold speech to the 1896 Democratic Party Convention.

The house served Bryan as both a private and public space. He hosted numerous gatherings, including political rallies and other public events, and also hosted prominent political figures of the day. In 1921, Bryan donated the house and 10 acres (4.0 ha) of land to the Nebraska Methodist Conference for use as a hospital. The hospital, now Bryan Health, has grown to surround the house on two sides, obscuring the "fair view" for which Bryan named the property. The hospital at first used the house as a dormitory for nurses in training. Although the building remains in the hospital's ownership, it was restored in 1961 to the period of Bryan's occupancy, and opened as a museum operated by the state historical society and the local Junior League.

The home was restored in 1994. The upper two floors house the Wm. Jennings Bryan Institute, which consists of three centers: the Center for Bioethics, the Center for Advancing Nursing Practice and the Center for Quality.

On November 7, 2026, the house was moved from its original location on Sumner Street to a site 1,200 feet northeast on 52nd and A. This was accomplished using a hydraulic jacking system and 30 remote-controlled dollies. Bryan Health announced plans to build an expanded neonatal intensive care unit on the old site to meet increasing demand due to regional hospitals no longer offering obstetric care.

== See also ==
- List of National Historic Landmarks in Nebraska
- National Register of Historic Places listings in Lancaster County, Nebraska
