= Glenville School (Greenwich, Connecticut) =

- U.S. National Register of Historic Places
- U.S. Historic district – Contributing property
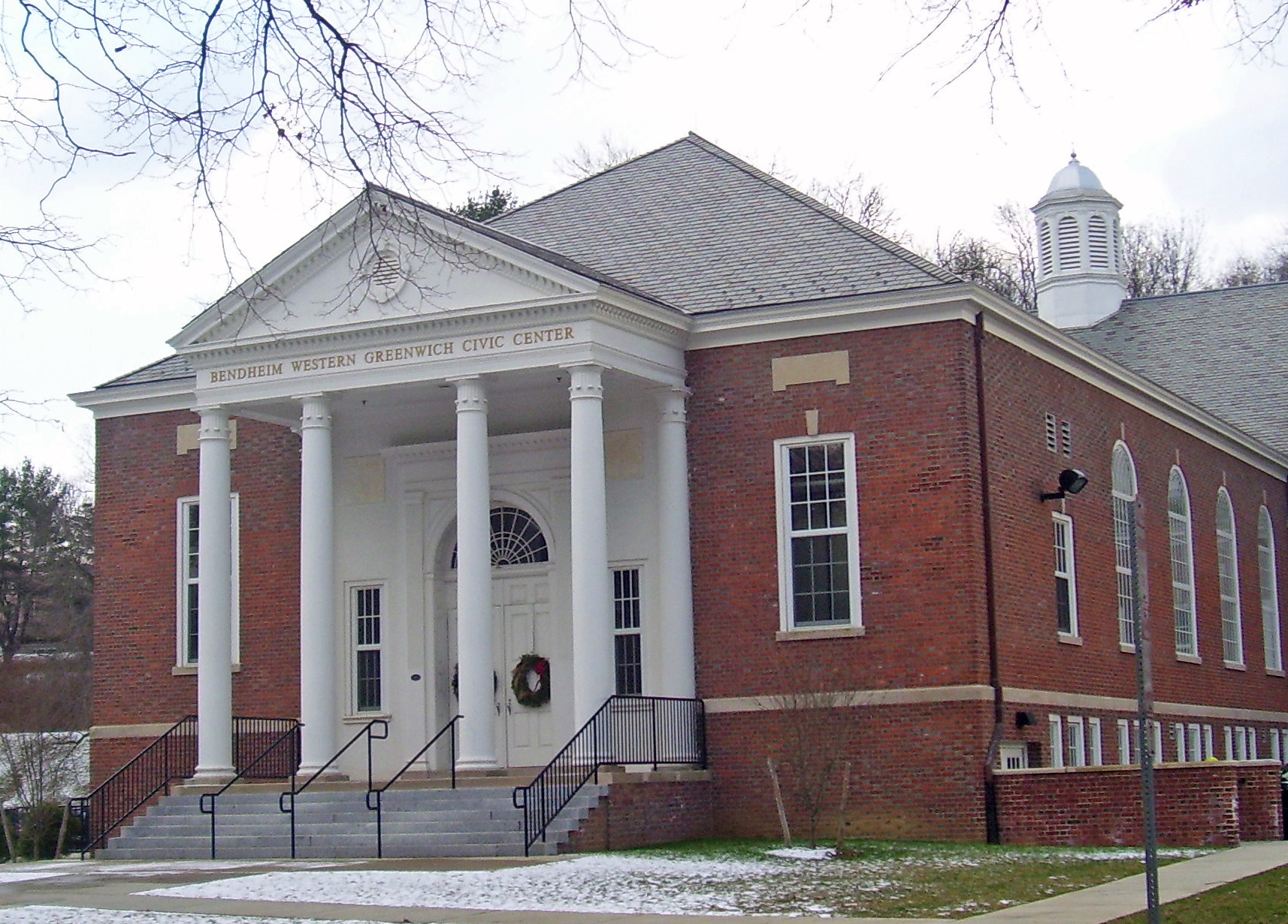
- North (front) elevation, 2008

- Location within Connecticut Location within the United States
- Location: Greenwich, CT
- Coordinates: 41°2′12″N 73°39′52″W
- Area: 10 acres (4.0 ha)
- Built: 1921
- Architects: James O. Betelle; Rangley Construction Company
- Architectural style: Colonial Revival
- Part of: Glenville Historic District
- NRHP reference No.: 03001169
- Added to NRHP: November 21, 2003

The Glenville School is a historic school building at 449 Pemberwick Road in the Glenville section of Greenwich, Connecticut, United States. It was listed on the National Register of Historic Places in 2003. It was one of several schools built in the town in the 1920s, when it consolidated its former rural school districts into a modern school system, with modern buildings.

Architect James O. Betelle, a specialist in school buildings, produced a Georgian Revival school similar to the seven other ones in the town. However, Glenville's is the only one built in a "T" shape, with the auditorium in a front wing. It soon became the major public building in this former mill community, and in 1975, after the elementary school moved to a more modern building, the existing facility became the home of the Western Greenwich Civic Center. In 2003 it was added to the National Register of Historic Places, both in its own right and as a contributing property to the Glenville Historic District.

== Building ==
The school property is a 10-acre (4.0 ha) lot on Pemberwick Road, just southeast of the downtown section of Glenville, a section of Greenwich on the state line next to Rye, New York (Port Chester, N.Y.) . It is across the street from the village green and the mill pond in the Byram River. The Hawthorne Woolen Mill that was once the economic center of Glenville, now used as stores and office space, is across Pemberwick to the southwest.

The building is located in the northwest corner of the lot. To the east are two baseball fields; Weaver Street bounds the property on that side. The southern and western sections are wooded, extending to Hawthorne Street North and Highview Road respectively and rear lot lines of houses on those streets. A diverse group of species, including London plane, sycamore, lindens and maples, have been planted.

=== Exterior ===
The school itself is faced in brick laid in Flemish bond trimmed with cast stone sills, keystones, and water table on a high basement. Both wings are topped with slate hipped roofs, with overhanging wooden eaves at the roofline. The two-and-a-half-story classroom wing, running east–west to the south, has an octagonal wooden cupola topped with bell roof and finial. Two small hip-roofed dormer windows pierce either end.

At the north end of the one-and-a-half-story auditorium wing is the main entrance, sheltered by a pedimented, tetrastyle portico. The six round wooden columns (two of which are engaged with the north facade) rising from the stylobate paved in basket weave-patterned brick three feet (1 m) below the water table to unusual capitals with acanthus leaves around a fluted neck. The entablature above echoes that with a fluted architrave, a plain frieze with "Bendheim Western Greenwich Civic Center" in gold lettering, and a dentilled cornice with Greek keys in the modillions. In the center is a round vent with directional keystones.

The wall behind the portico is faced in stucco. The main entrance's double wooden doors are recessed in a large round arch topped with a leaded fanlight and flanked by two fluted pilasters topped with a similar cornice to the pediment. Next to it are cast stone panels that top the narrow windows beside the pilasters. On either side of the portico are nine-over-nine sash windows.

On either side of the north wing, the six bays have four large round-arched windows with molded reveal and tracery. The north end has a regular casement window; the south end has no window. A set of steps lead down to the basement at the north end of the eastern face.

The auditorium wing divides the north face of the main wing into two identical sections with two-story, three-bay projecting pavilions and a three-bay hyphen with shed-roofed dormer window. On the western pavilion, a projecting entry bay is substituted for the easternmost window at ground level.

The east and west profiles have projecting bays with staircased entries. On the east it is centered with an arched window similar to those on the auditorium wing between two cast-stone belt courses and framed with some slightly projecting bricks. On the west end, a small flat-roofed extension projects to the south, and the fenestration consists of a row of five smaller arch windows between darker belt courses. The south elevation has windows in all ten bays on both stories.

=== Interior ===
The main doors open into a vaulted vestibule with paneled wainscoting and a chair rail. Tall pilasters support a simple, molded entablature and connect with the vault ribbing. Fluted pilasters also frame the door from the interior. A staircase with turned newel posts leads downstairs on the west side. A much shorter stairway leads into the auditorium through an entrance with an elliptical arch, molded keystone and molded impost blocks.

Pilasters also frame the windows within the auditorium, with picture panels between them. A molded cornice is at the ceiling line. The stage also has wainscoting and a molded chair rail.

Many original elements also remain in the classroom, though these are less decorative. Each hallway has an arched marble niche with a drinking fountain. At each end of the three hallways is a three-part wood and glass door with transom in textured glass. The hallways are all wainscoted.

== History ==
The original Glenville school district dates to 1756. It served the small community that grew up around the gristmill on the Byram. By the late 19th century, it had been displaced by a textile mill employing mostly Irish immigrants who comprised most of the village's population. In 1882 a two-story brick building replaced the original one-room wooden schoolhouse.

In 1910 Greenwich consolidated its small local districts into one large one covering the whole town. Expansions to the mills had nearly doubled Glenville's population, with more Polish immigrants coming in, and the school building became overcrowded. The building's neglect and its educational impact, such as classes held in hallways, was the subject of a state report and then a scathing article on June 16, 1912 in The New York Times. Called "Rich Greenwich Spends More on Tires than Schools," it deplored how affluent Greenwich, which relied on philanthropy for much of its school funding, did not keep schools in working-class neighborhoods up to the same standards as those in richer ones.

The town began an ambitious building program to correct the issue. Originally the recommendation was that the existing Glenville School be retained and expanded, but later it was decided to build the new school. It absorbed students from several other closed schools in that part of town. James O. Betelle, a Newark, New Jersey, architect whose large institutional and commercial commissions specialize in schools, about which he wrote a great deal, contributed the design. It and two other schools in Greenwich are his only known work in Connecticut, aside from some buildings at what is now Central Connecticut State University in New Britain.

When built, the school originally sat on just the 3.3 acres (1.3 ha) immediately around it. On its dedication day in 1921, 600 people attended in addition to the 350 students it was designed to hold along with faculty. Classes were held for an hour prior to the ceremony so parents and visitors could observe how they were conducted. In addition to the traditional academic disciplines offerings included sewing, cooking and drawing. The Social Service League of Greenwich operated a large community medical clinic in the building for Glenville residents.

The school building quickly became the focal point of the neighborhood, displacing the declining mills that had given rise to the community in the first place. In 1931, the other 6.7 acres (2.7 ha) of the property were acquired and fields built. It was complemented by the two-acre (8,000 m^{2}) village green that the town bought in 1938, and the firehouse opposite.

Minor alterations were made to the interior in the middle of the century. The school remained in use until a new one was built on Riversville Road in 1975. It was immediately converted into a civic center, with upgrades made to its plumbing and heating. In the late 2000, it was extensively renovated. Few other modifications have been made, and it is the most intact of the schools Greenwich built in the early 20th century.

The civic center building is open on weekday mornings. Sundays, it is used for religious services; at other times it is used for community purposes, like Scout troop meetings, continuing education, a thrift shop, café, indoor sports and children's playgroups. The playground and fields are available for community use, as well. After the renovation, a weight room and day care center were also available.

== See also ==
- National Register of Historic Places listings in Fairfield County, Connecticut
