= Glenville, Connecticut =

Census-designated place in Connecticut, United States

- Census-designated place
- Location in Fairfield County and the state of Connecticut.
- Coordinates: 41°02′07″N 73°39′35″W
- State: Connecticut
- County: Fairfield
- Region: Western CT
- Town: Greenwich

Area
  - Total: 0.739 sq mi (1.91 km^{2})
  - Land: 0.739 sq mi (1.91 km^{2})
  - Water: 0 sq mi (0 km^{2})
- Elevation: 112 ft (34 m)

Population (2010)
  - Total: 2,327
  - Density: 3,150/sq mi (1,220/km^{2})
- FIPS code: 09-31520
- GNIS feature ID: 2631564

Glenville is a neighborhood and census-designated place in the town of Greenwich in Fairfield County, Connecticut, United States. As of the 2020 census, Glenville had a population of 2,762. It is located in the western part of Greenwich at the falls of the Byram River, which provided waterpower when this was a mill village. The area is home to Glenville Elementary school, Western Civic Center and a volunteer fire station, the Glenville Fire Department.

The town of Greenwich is one political and taxing body, but consists of several distinct sections or neighborhoods, such as Banksville, Byram, Cos Cob, Glenville, Mianus, Old Greenwich, Riverside and Greenwich (sometimes referred to as central, or downtown, Greenwich). Of these neighborhoods, three (Cos Cob, Old Greenwich, and Riverside) have separate postal names and ZIP codes.

== Historic district ==
The original settlement of Glenville, which was formerly known as "Sherwood's Bridge", was listed on the National Register of Historic Places in 2007 as the Glenville Historic District. The district covers 33.9 acres (13.7 ha) and is the "most comprehensive example of a New England mill village within the Town of Greenwich". It "is also historically significant as one of the town's major staging areas of immigrants, predominantly Irish in the 19th century and Polish in the 20th century" and remains "the primary settlement of Poles in the town". Further, "[t]he district is architecturally significant because it contains two elaborate examples of mill construction, designed in the Romanesque Revival and a transitional Stick-style/Queen Anne; an excellent example of a Georgian Revival school; and notable examples of domestic and commercial architecture, including a Queen Anne mansion and an Italianate store building."

== Geography ==
According to the United States Census Bureau, the CDP has a total area of 0.739 square miles (1.91 km^{2}), all land.

== Demographics ==
=== 2020 census ===
As of the 2020 census, Glenville had a population of 2,762. The median age was 46.0 years. 21.8% of residents were under the age of 18 and 20.3% of residents were 65 years of age or older. For every 100 females there were 89.8 males, and for every 100 females age 18 and over there were 86.4 males age 18 and over.

100.0% of residents lived in urban areas, while 0.0% lived in rural areas.

There were 1,036 households in Glenville, of which 27.5% had children under the age of 18 living in them. Of all households, 57.2% were married-couple households, 10.9% were households with a male householder and no spouse or partner present, and 27.9% were households with a female householder and no spouse or partner present. About 25.3% of all households were made up of individuals and 15.3% had someone living alone who was 65 years of age or older.

There were 1,120 housing units, of which 7.5% were vacant. The homeowner vacancy rate was 1.5% and the rental vacancy rate was 4.6%.

Racial composition as of the 2020 census
Race	Number	Percent
White	2,212	80.1%
Black or African American	50	1.8%
American Indian and Alaska Native	2	0.1%
Asian	186	6.7%
Native Hawaiian and Other Pacific Islander	0	0.0%
Some other race	78	2.8%
Two or more races	234	8.5%
Hispanic or Latino (of any race)	230	8.3%

== Community ==
The center of Glenville boasts a variety of attractions. Notably, the Bendheim Western Greenwich Civic Center is located in the heart of the neighborhood. Next to the Civic Center is a baseball diamond and playground. There is a large hill above the baseball field that is a popular place for children to sled in the wintertime.

== Education ==
As with other parts of the Town of Greenwich, Glenville is in the Greenwich Public Schools school district. The district's comprehensive high school is Greenwich High School.

== Notable person ==
- Rob Marciano - former ABC News meteorologist from 2014 until 2024, born in Glenville.
