= Park Hill (Lincoln, Nebraska) =

- U.S. National Register of Historic Places
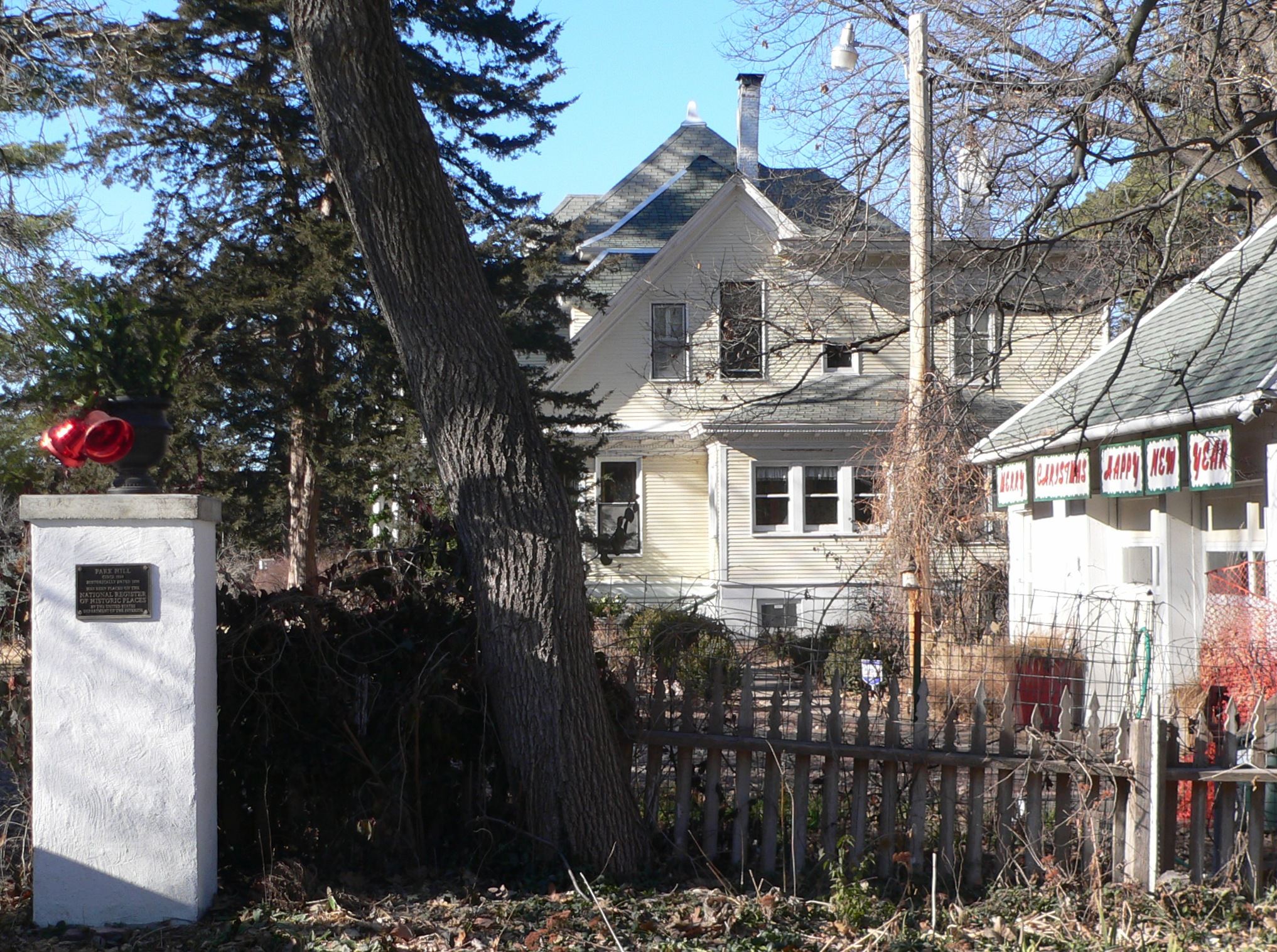
- Park Hill, seen from the east side.

- Location within Nebraska Location within the United States
- Location: 1913 S 41st Street, Lincoln, Nebraska
- Coordinates: 40°47′35″N 96°39′46″W
- Area: 3.4 acres (1.4 ha)
- Built: 1896
- Architect: Artemas Roberts & Alfred W. Woods/Edward C. Robison
- Architectural style: Colonial Revival
- NRHP reference No.: 10000628
- Added to NRHP: September 3, 2010

Park Hill, also known as the Young-Faulkner House or Faulkner's Park Hill, is a 2 1/2-story Colonial Revival residence built in the late 1890s in Lincoln, Nebraska. Park Hill is listed in the National Register of Historic Places, and is significant for its architectural features—including the house, a garage, and a bridge—as well as its landscape, nearly three and a half acres of land bordered by thick, mature plantings of trees.

== Description ==
Park Hill is a rare example of the Colonial Revival style in Lincoln. The style is embodied both in the architecture of the house as well as its placement within its large, formerly-suburban lot.

=== Structures ===
The site contains two period structures which contribute to its historicity: the house itself, built in 1896, and the garage, built sometime in the early 20th century.

The Park Hill house is a 2 1/2-story, wood-frame home with wooden clapboard siding. The house is of particular interest because of its Colonial Revival architectural style, embodied in its gable roof; dormers; multi-pane, double-hung sash, and bay windows; and nearly-symmetrical facade. A further element contributing to this style is its prominent south entrance, enhanced by a pair of two-story bay windows, wide front steps, a second-story screened balcony, and a central dormer with a twin-peak roof.

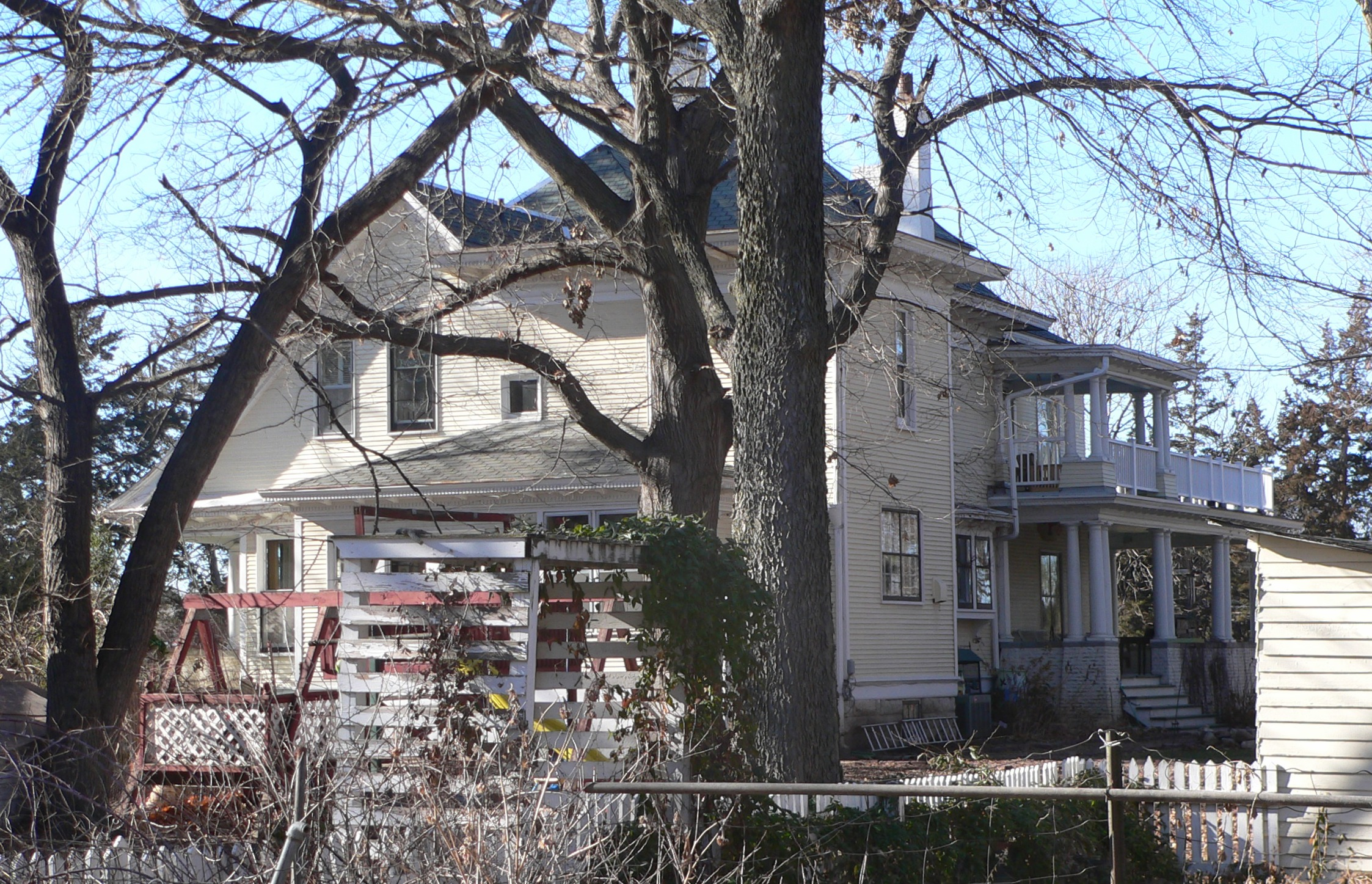
Park Hill, seen from the northeast, rear entrance and east wing visible.

A wide porch wraps around the south, west, and north sides of the building, and features a split-face brick wall as its railing and paired doric columns as supports. The first-story porch continues above into the second-story porch, lined with smaller paired columns and a wooden balustrade of simple, square-section spindles. The west side of the building is capped with a second, large dormer which sits in the center of the west pitch of the roof and is decorated with a broken scroll pediment, exemplary of the Colonial Revival style. A large, decorative plaque is centered between the two second-story windows on the west facade.

On the north facade there is a rear entrance, opposite the main, south entrance. The east facade features a 1 1/2-story wing—which may have been a preexisting farmhouse at the time of construction—with a gable roof within which sits a small, hipped-roof dormer on the south side. The east wing is framed by a shallower, single-columned porch along its south face.

The garage, which is dated to the early 20th century, is located in the northeast corner of the lot and features a hipped roof.

=== Landscape ===
The nearly-three-and-a-half acre lot of the property allow the house to retain its suburban setting despite being situated at a major intersection. The house sits on a hill on the north end of the lot, which slopes southward, and wide south and west lawns set it away from the busy intersection. Originally, the entrance to the house was in the southwest corner of the lot, however, this entrance was destroyed when the intersection of 40th and South Streets was widened. However, the former driveway is still visible due to its mature, double-row plantings of locust trees; stone curbs; small, period bridge with stone abutments and timber planks; and brick forecourt.

== History ==
In March 1896, Lincoln real estate investor and former superintendent of the Lincoln Street Railway, Louis P. Young, inherited several acres of farmland southeast of Lincoln from his father-in-law, Martin Cook. Young sought to capitalize on the booming real estate business of the 1880s and 1890s by building a large home on the land. Based on physical evidence in the home, it is likely that Young built the newer house adjacent to Cook's preexisting farmhouse, which was later remodeled and connected to form the east wing of the home.

Young's fortunes soured after the Panic of 1893 and eventually the house was foreclosed upon before being bought by Dr. Albert O. Faulkner sometime between 1898 and 1901. Faulkner was a medical doctor as well as being the founder of the Modern Woodmen Accident Company. Faulkner was also a major investor in the local utilities (Lincoln Telephone Company), transit (Citizen Street Railway Co.), and real estate markets. Though the building was already completed when the Faulkner family purchased it, they were the first to live in the house long-term and as such, all major remodeling was done during their residency.

In 1911, Faulkner platted the 40 acres he had purchased as "Faulkner's Park Hill." This platting created the large lot on which Park Hill is built as well as giving the land its name. In 1922, Faulkner's son, E.J. Faulkner, built a house directly across South 41st St. from Park Hill at 4100 South St. The Faulkners maintained prominent presence in Lincoln academic and business circles for many years.

== Notable residents ==
- Dr. Albert O. Faulkner, physician, businessman, and prominent citizen of Lincoln, Nebraska. Founder of Modern Woodmen Accident Company of Lincoln.
