= Glenville School (Glenvil, Nebraska) =

- U.S. National Register of Historic Places
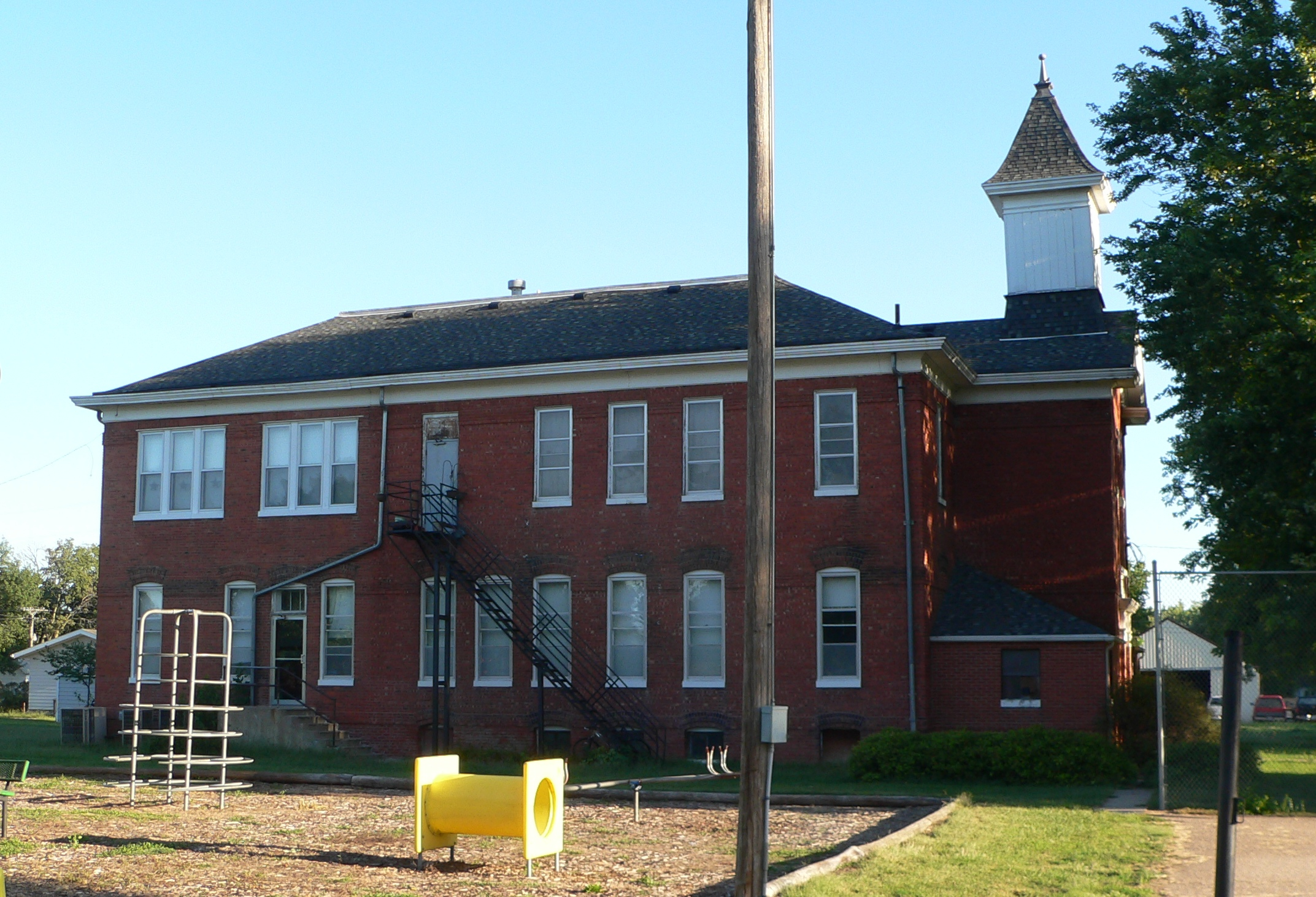
- Glenville School, seen from the south

- Location within Nebraska Location within the United States
- Location: 401 S. Fifth St., Glenvil, Nebraska
- Coordinates: 40°30′8″N 98°15′22″W
- Area: Less than one acre
- Built: 1903, 1924, 1950
- Built by: Hempel Bros.
- Architect: Alfred W. Woods
- NRHP reference No.: 98001566
- Added to NRHP: December 31, 1998

The Glenville School in what is now Glenvil, Nebraska, United States was built in 1903 and extended in 1924 and 1950. It is a simple two-story brick building with classical details. It was designed by Lincoln architect Alfred W. Woods or his firm, and was built by Hempel Brothers. The school included an outdoor play area, which in 1903 was a new idea for rural schools.

Preceding the incorporation of Glenville as a settlement in 1873, Glenville's first school was organized during 1871–72. Like other rural schools, it was a wood-frame building. In 1882, the building was demolished by a tornado and was rebuilt.

The Glenville School served as a school from 1903 to 1995. It was the first substantial school in the small village of Glenville, which peaked in population at about 300 in the 1920s, and had declined to about half that in 1998 (although it had grown back to 310 in the 2010 census). It first served just Kindergarten through eighth grade, but 9th and 10th grades were added and, with the 1924 expansion, the school accommodated 11th and 12th grades. This created the Glenville High School.

It was listed on the National Register of Historic Places in 1998. It was deemed significant "for its contribution to educational development in the small village."

Both the outdoor playground and the combination of all grades in one school were progressive interests of William K. Fowler, who started in 1900 as the state Superintendent of Public Instruction.

Two other Nebraska schools that combined elementary and high schools and are listed on the National Register are the 1897-built Valentine Public School in north central Nebraska and the Steele City School in southeastern Nebraska.
