= Artemus Roberts =

American architect

Artemus Roberts (October 28, 1841 – May 8, 1944) was an architect based in Lincoln, Nebraska. He is perhaps best known as the architect of Fairview House, which was the home of presidential candidate (1896, 1900, 1908) William Jennings Bryan.

== Early life ==
Artemus Roberts was born on October 28, 1841, in Richmond, Indiana. His parents moved the family to Pendleton, Indiana in 1852, where he lived until attending University of Michigan, at Ann Arbor, in 1863.

== Career ==
After graduating from the University of Michigan, Roberts worked as an architect with his brother, Thomas Roberts, a contractor in Richmond, Indiana. In the fall of 1869 he took a position at a Chicago firm. Due to work being scarce he travelled west to Lincoln, Nebraska with two acquaintances that happened to be from Pendleton, Indiana. He worked with his partner Alfred W. Woods from 1890 to 1903. His first commissioned work in Lincoln was to design some furniture for the executive offices at the State Capitol. At the time however he was informed that he would not be paid for the work until legislature met in the following winter to have an appropriation made. Falling on hard times, Roberts searched for other work in the area. This search eventually led him to a cornfield in the now downtown Lincoln area. At first he was laughed at for his approach as his “hands were too white,” but he proved himself on the first day. The owner then offered him a vacant house on his property and the next day he was officially on the job.

After working as a farm hand and carpenter he finally had the opportunity to work on the original Lincoln High School. He was later involved in the repair of the foundations of the State University building, the first building on Lincoln's campus. Perhaps his most well known project is the Fairview House. Even though this is his most known project, it may be one that he was least proud of. It incorporated many different ideas and styles that Mrs. Bryan insisted on having, which he then deemed to have no style.

== Projects ==
Name	Year	Location	Present status
Sawyer House	1887	Lincoln	Torn down
Fairview House	1902	50th and Sumner, Lincoln, NE	Standing
Herpolsheimer Building	1880s	Lincoln	Torn down
William H. Charlton House	1872	Roca, Nebraska	Standing
Commercial Block High School Building			
State Normal School Building		Peru	
High School Building		Seward	
School Buildings		Harvard; Inland; Kenesaw; Sutton; Bennet	
Smith Bros. Bank		Beatrice	
Capitol Block			
Lancaster Co. Bank Building			
Davis & Alexander Block			
Davis Bros. Building			
Haas and Winger Block			
Kingman Block			
Zehrung's Block			
City Block			
Odd Fellows’ Building			

== Personal life ==
Roberts had seven sons, including J. R. Roberts who founded Roberts Dairy Company that was later purchased by Prairie Farms Dairy. Later his grandson J. Gordon Roberts became the president of Roberts Dairy.

Artemus Roberts himself had been involved in agricultural practices for most of his life. In 1924 he designed the exterior for the Roberts Dairy building in Lincoln, and later purchased the Roberts farm on East A Street. While still practicing architecture with Alfred Woods, he also served as city engineer for two years and was interested in prohibition. He published a prohibition paper in the 1880s when he was serving as president of the New Republic Publishing Company. When he finally left Lincoln he moved to Dade City, Florida where he purchased a fruit ranch and was president of the Farmers club for 40 years.

== Death ==
Artemus Roberts died at his home May 8, 1944 in Dade City, Florida at the age of 102. His last visit in Lincoln was in the summer of 1940.
