= Tifereth Israel Synagogue =

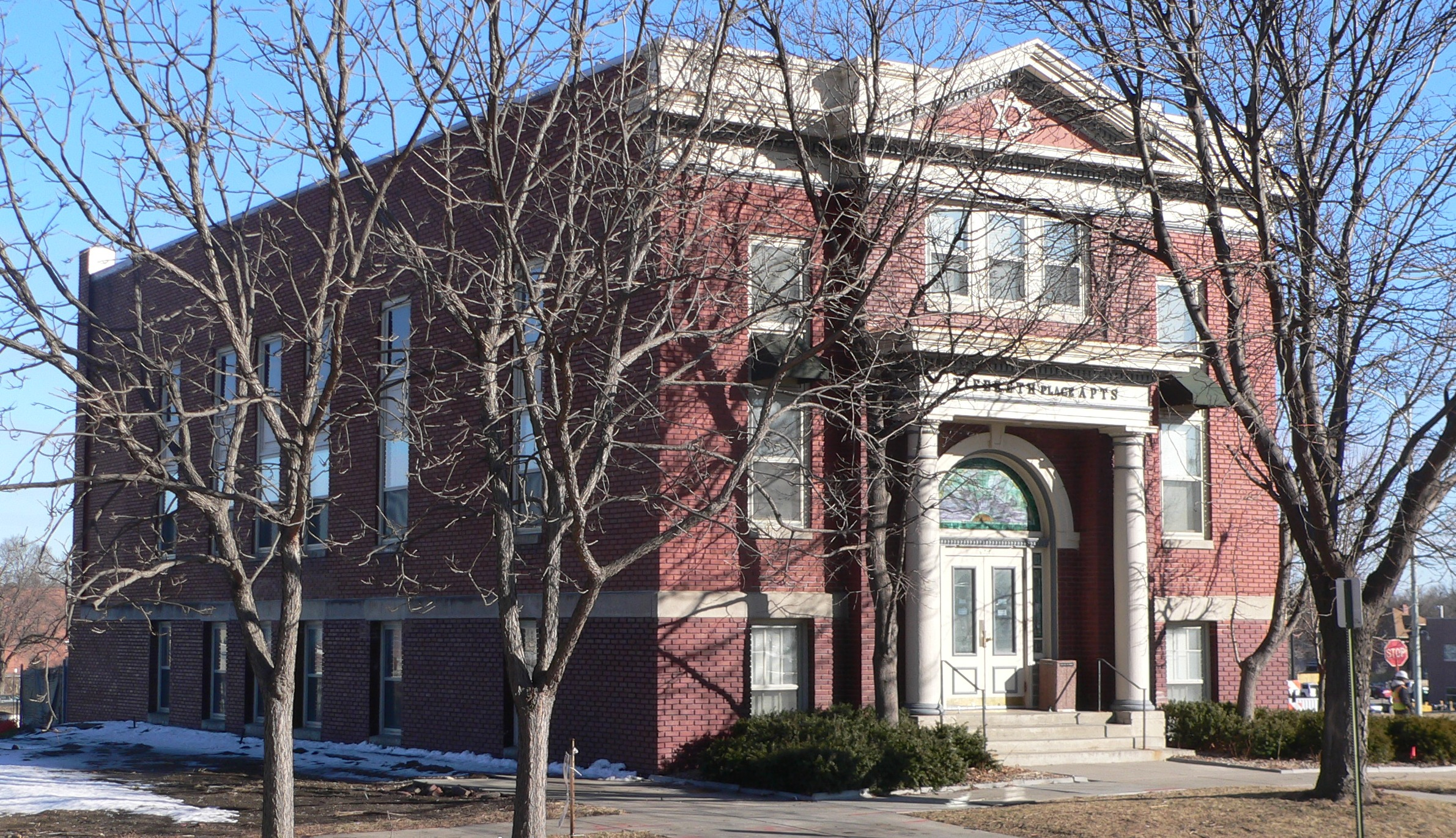
- The former synagogue, in 2012

- Location in Nebraska

Religion
- Affiliation: Orthodox Judaism (former)
- Ecclesiastical or organizational status: Synagogue (1913–1954); Residential
- Status: Closed (as a synagogue); Repurposed (as apartments)

Location
- Location: 344 South 18th Street, Lincoln, Nebraska
- Country: United States
- Interactive map of Tifereth Israel Synagogue
- Coordinates: 40°48′37″N 96°41′41″W

Architecture
- Architects: Fred Young, Jr.
- Type: Synagogue architecture
- Style: Classical Revival
- General contractor: Alfred W. Woods
- Completed: 1913
- Tifereth Israel Synagogue
- U.S. National Register of Historic Places
- Area: less than one acre
- NRHP reference No.: 85000958
- Added to NRHP: May 9, 1985

The Tifereth Israel Synagogue is a historic building in Lincoln, Nebraska. It was built by Alfred W. Woods in 1913 as an Orthodox synagogue, and designed in the Classical Revival style by architect Fred Young, Jr. In the 1950s, it was repurposed as a community playhouse. It was later used as an organ factory, and eventually remodeled into a residential apartment building. It has been listed on the National Register of Historic Places since May 9, 1985.

Congregation Tifereth Israel moved in 1954 to a new building at 3219 Sheridan Boulevard and is currently active as a Conservative congregation.
