= Glenville, Cumberland County, Nova Scotia =

Community in Nova Scotia, Canada

Coordinates: 45°41′35″N 63°56′59″W

Glenville in Nova Scotia

Glenville is a community in the Canadian province of Nova Scotia, located in Cumberland County.
