= Glenvil, Nebraska =

- Village
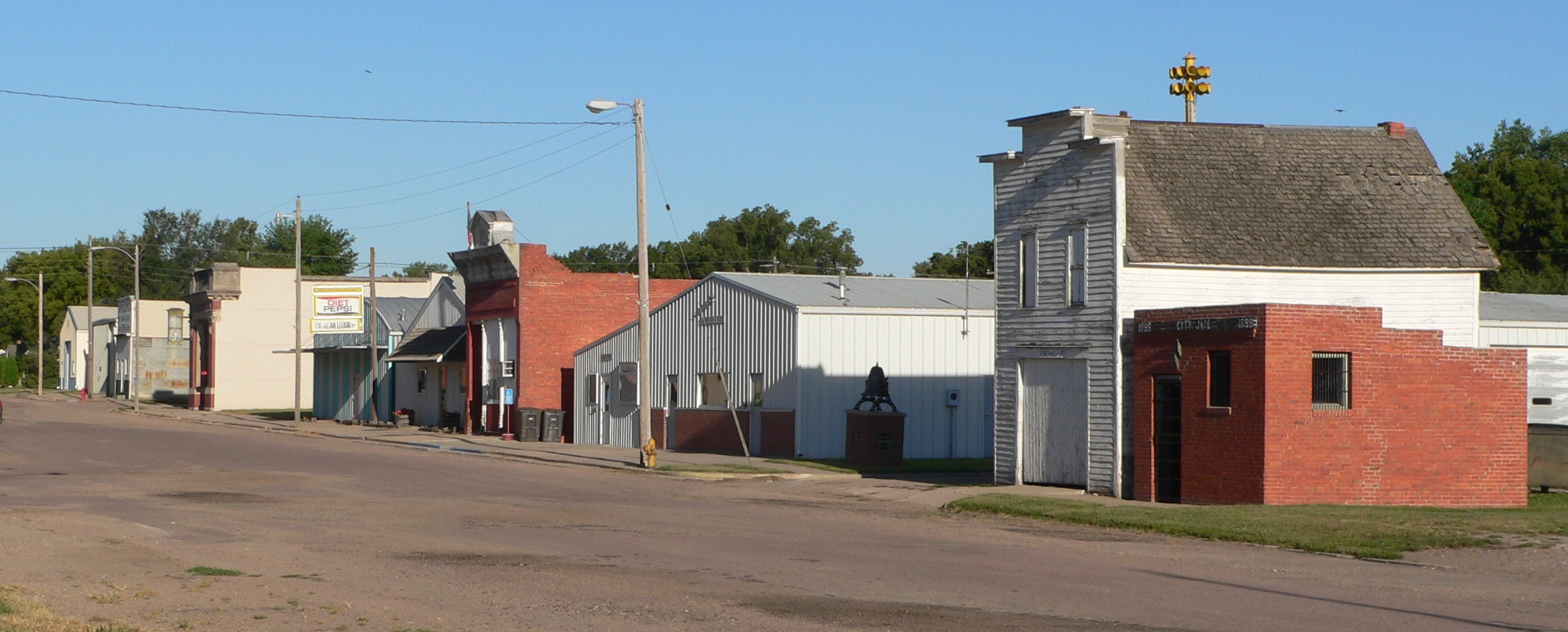
- Downtown Glenvil: Winters Avenue

- Location of Glenvil, Nebraska
- Coordinates: 40°30′10″N 98°15′16″W
- Country: United States
- State: Nebraska
- County: Clay

Area
  - Total: 0.17 sq mi (0.45 km^{2})
  - Land: 0.17 sq mi (0.45 km^{2})
  - Water: 0 sq mi (0.00 km^{2})
- Elevation: 1,844 ft (562 m)

Population (2020)
  - Total: 267
  - Estimate (2021): 266
  - Density: 1,500/sq mi (590/km^{2})
- Time zone: UTC-6 (Central (CST))
  - Summer (DST): UTC-5 (CDT)
- ZIP code: 68941
- Area code: 402
- FIPS code: 31-19070
- GNIS feature ID: 2398978
- Website: www.villageofglenvil.org

Glenvil is a village in Clay County, Nebraska, United States. The settlement was formerly also known as Glenville. The population was 267 at the 2020 census. It is part of the Hastings, Nebraska Micropolitan Statistical Area.

== History ==
Glenvil was founded in 1873 when the St. Joseph & Denver City Railroad was extended to that point.

The Glenvil post office, first established in 1873 (in the year the settlement was first surveyed) was spelled Glenville until 1914.

Glenvil's population peaked at about 300 in the 1920s, and fell to about half that in 1998.

Glenville's first school was organized during 1871-72 and, like other rural schools, was housed in a wood-frame building. It was demolished by a tornado and rebuilt in 1882. The Glenville School, the first substantial school in the village, operated from 1903 to 1995 and is listed on the National Register of Historic Places.

Glenvil received national attention in 1997 when residents wrote letters to celebrities asking for money to help build a new playground. Letters were sent to billionaire Warren Buffett, comedian Robin Williams, talk show hosts Jay Leno, David Letterman and Oprah Winfrey; and Microsoft Chairman Bill Gates asking for financial help. Gates was the only one who responded as he wrote back and included a check for $5,000. Less than a month after Gates donated the $5,000 Merle Hinrichs, chairman of Asian Sources Media in Hong Kong, mailed a check for $20,000 after project organizers said they needed more money for playground equipment. Hinrichs attended school in Glenvil.

== Geography ==
According to the United States Census Bureau, the village has a total area of 0.17 square miles (0.44 km^{2}), all land.

== Demographics ==
Historical population
Census	Pop.	Note	%±
1900	246		—
1910	304		23.6%
1920	400		31.6%
1930	376		−6.0%
1940	285		−24.2%
1950	281		−1.4%
1960	323		14.9%
1970	332		2.8%
1980	363		9.3%
1990	304		−16.3%
2000	332		9.2%
2010	310		−6.6%
2020	260		−16.1%
2021 (est.)	266	▲	2.3%
U.S. Decennial Census

=== 2010 census ===
At the 2010 census, there were 310 people, 125 households and 83 families residing in the village. The population density was 1,823.5 per square mile (704.1/km^{2}). There were 137 housing units at an average density of 805.9 per square mile (311.2/km^{2}). The racial make-up was 92.9% White, 1.6% African American, 0.6% Native American, 1.9% from other races and 2.9% from two or more races. Hispanic or Latino of any race were 4.5% of the population.

There were 125 households, of which 35.2% had children under the age of 18 living with them, 49.6% were married couples living together, 11.2% had a female householder with no husband present, 5.6% had a male householder with no wife present, and 33.6% were non-families. 28.0% of all households were made up of individuals, and 10.4% had someone living alone who was 65 years of age or older. The average household size was 2.48 and the average family size was 3.06.

The median age was 38 years. 28.1% of residents were under the age of 18; 6.7% were between the ages of 18 and 24; 23.6% were from 25 to 44; 26.2% were from 45 to 64; and 15.5% were 65 years of age or older. The sex make-up of the village was 49.7% male and 50.3% female.

=== 2000 census ===
At the 2000 census, there were 332 people, 132 households and 97 families residing in the village. The population density was 1,999.8 per square mile (772.1/km^{2}). There were 139 housing units at an average density of 837.3 per square mile (323.3/km^{2}). The racial make-up was 98.49% White and 1.51% Asian.

There were 132 households, of which 32.6% had children under the age of 18 living with them, 63.6% were married couples living together, 6.8% had a female householder with no husband present, and 25.8% were non-families. 22.0% of all households were made up of individuals, and 9.1% had someone living alone who was 65 years of age or older. The average household size was 2.52 and the average family size was 2.89.

26.5% of the population were under the age of 18, 9.3% from 18 to 24, 27.4% from 25 to 44, 21.4% from 45 to 64, and 15.4% were 65 years of age or older. The median age was 35 years. For every 100 females, there were 103.7 males. For every 100 females age 18 and over, there were 112.2 males.

The median household income was $36,875 and the median family income was $39,625. Males had a median income of $26,417 and females $15,938. The per capita income was $18,532. About 1.8% of families and 1.9% of the population were below the poverty line, including none of those under the age of eighteen, sixty-five or over.
