= Raymond E. Feist bibliography =

This is a complete bibliography of the works by American fantasy fiction author Raymond E. Feist.

== Bibliography ==
=== Riftwar Cycle ===
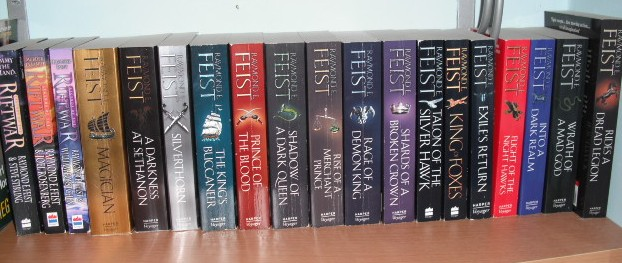
The Books of the Riftwar Cycle (all out of order and missing The Empire Trilogy, The Riftwar Legacy, At the Gates of Darkness, A Kingdom Besieged and A Crown Imperilled)

==== The Riftwar Saga ====
1. Magician (1982), republished in two parts in the United States in 1986 as Magician: Apprentice and Magician: Master, illustrated by Braldt Bralds in 1984
2. Silverthorn (1985)
3. A Darkness at Sethanon (1986)

==== The Empire Trilogy ====
1. Daughter of the Empire (1987) with Janny Wurts
2. Servant of the Empire (1990) with Janny Wurts
3. Mistress of the Empire (1992) with Janny Wurts

==== Krondor's Sons ====
1. Prince of the Blood (1989)
2. The King's Buccaneer (1992)

==== The Serpentwar Saga ====
1. Shadow of a Dark Queen (1994)
2. Rise of a Merchant Prince (1995)
3. Rage of a Demon King (1997)
4. Shards of a Broken Crown (1998)

==== The Riftwar Legacy ====
1. Krondor: The Betrayal (1998) – A novelization of the 1993 PC game Betrayal at Krondor
2. Krondor: The Assassins (1999)
3. Krondor: Tear of the Gods (2000) – A novelization of the 1998 PC game Return to Krondor
4. Jimmy and the Crawler (2013) – a novella replacing the cancelled novels Krondor: The Crawler and Krondor: The Dark Mage

==== Legends of the Riftwar ====
1. Honoured Enemy (2001) with William R. Forstchen, aka Honored Enemy
2. Murder in LaMut (2002) with Joel Rosenberg
3. Jimmy the Hand (2003) with S. M. Stirling

==== Conclave of Shadows ====
1. Talon of the Silver Hawk (2002)
2. King of Foxes (2003)
3. Exile's Return (2004)

==== The Darkwar Saga ====
1. Flight of the Nighthawks (2005)
2. Into a Dark Realm (2006)
3. Wrath of a Mad God (2008)

==== The Demonwar Saga ====
1. Rides a Dread Legion (2009)
2. At the Gates of Darkness (2009)

==== The Chaoswar Saga ====
1. A Kingdom Besieged (2011)
2. A Crown Imperiled (2012)
3. Magician's End (2013)

==== Companion works ====
- Midkemia: The Chronicles of Pug (2013) with Stephen Abrams – "coffee table book" with maps and illustrations.

=== The Firemane Saga ===
1. King of Ashes (2018)
2. Queen of Storms (2020)
3. Master of Furies (2022)

=== The Dragonwar Saga ===
1. A Darkness Returns (2024)

=== Stand-alone novels ===
- Faerie Tale (1988)

=== Short stories ===
- Profit and the Grey Assassin (1982) (set in the Riftwar Universe) in Fantasy Book, May 1982 (magazine)
- Geroldo's Incredible Trick (1997) in A Magic Lovers Treasury of the Fantastic (ed. Margaret Weis)
- The Wood Boy (1998) in Legends (ed. Robert Silverberg)
- One to Go (2002) in Thieves World: Turning Points (ed. Lynn Abbey)
- The Messenger (2003) in Legends II (ed. Robert Silverberg)
- Watchfire (2004) with Janny Wurts in Flights: Extreme Visions of Fantasy (ed. Al Sarrantonio)

=== Role playing games ===
- Tulan of the Isles (1981) with Stephen Abrams, published by Midkemia Press
- Jonril: Gateway to the Sunken Lands (1982) with Stephen Abrams published by Midkemia Press
