= Geoff Taylor (illustrator) =

English fantasy artist (born 1946)

- Born: 1946 (age 79–80); Lancaster, Lancashire, England
- Occupations: Fantasy artist, illustrator

Geoff Taylor (born 1946 in Lancaster) is an English fantasy artist.

Taylor has illustrated books for famous fantasy writers such as Robert Holdstock, Philip K. Dick, David and Leigh Eddings, Graham Edwards, Raymond E. Feist, Katharine Kerr, J. R. R. Tolkien, Roger Zelazny, and David Zindell. Taylor is also known for his illustrations for Jeff Wayne's Musical Version of The War of the Worlds, and the Chronicles of Ancient Darknessa series of books by Michelle Paver. Since 1991 he has painted some of the rich imagery for Games Workshop and their unique Warhammer World, in addition to painting covers for the Black Library, an offshoot of Games Workshop, and gaming cards for Sabertooth Games.

== Bibliography ==
- A Handful of Thieves (1979) Nina Bawden
- A Pistol in Greenyards (1978) Mollie Hunter
- A Secret History of Time to Come (1983) Robie Macauley
- A Time of Exile (1991) Katharine Kerr
- A Time of Justice (1995) Katharine Kerr
- A Time of Omens (1993) Katharine Kerr
- A Time of War (1994) Katharine Kerr
- Ancient Appetites (2008) Oisín McGann
- Ancient Echoes (1996) Robert Holdstock
- Archmage Eagle (2004) (WarCry trading card)
- Atlantis From Legend to Discovery (1972) Andrew Tomas
- Avalon (1988) Anya Seton
- Axel's Castle (1984) Edmund Wilson
- Beastslayer (2004) William King
- Behold the Man (1986) Michael Moorcock
- Belgarath the Sorcerer (1995) David Eddings
- Beloved Exile (1984) Parke Godwin
- Bestiary (Warhammer Fantasy sourcebook)
- Black Jade (2005) David Zindell
- Black Trillium (1991) Julian May Andre Norton Marion Zimmer Bradley
- Blood of Amber (1987) Roger Zelazny
- Blood Trillium (1992) Julian May
- Bowman (2008) James Fitzsimmons
- Broken Chalice (2002) Jane Welch
- Bug Jack Barron (1988) Norman Spinrad
- Camber the Heretic (1991) Katherine Kurtz
- Carrie's War Nina Bawden
- Cart and Cwidder (1993) Diana Wynne Jones
- Castle of Wizardry (1984) David Eddings
- Children of Destiny (1994) Elizabeth Chadwick
- Children of the Flame (1994) Mike Jefferies
- Citadel of Shadows (1996) Mike Jefferies
- Clan of the Cave Bear (1986) Jean M. Auel
- Clansman of Andor (1978) Andrew J. Offutt
- Clay's Ark (1985) Octavia E. Butler
- Counter Clock World (1977) Philip K. Dick
- Courage of Falcons (2002) Holly Lisle
- Crazy Games (2002) Sandra Glover
- Crich Tales (1983) Geoffrey Dawes
- Crown of Dalemark (1993) Diana Wynne Jones
- Crystal Gorge (v2) (2005) David Eddings
- Cugel's Saga (1985) Jack Vance
- Daemonslayer (2003) William King
- Daggerspell (1987) Katharine Kerr
- Damiano (1985) R. A. MacAvoy
- Damiano's Lute (1985) R. A. MacAvoy
- Damonen Kind (2007) Jennifer Roberson
- Daring Detectives (1977) Alfred Hitchcock
- Dark Prince (1991) David Gemmell
- A Darkness at Sethanon (1985) Raymond E. Feist
- Darkspell (1988) Katharine Kerr
- Das Geheimnis der Schonen Fremden (2005) Cecilia Dart-Thornton
- Das Kind Des Winters (2007) Robert Carter
- Daughter of the Empire (1987) Raymond E. Feist and Janny Wurts
- Dawn of a Dark Age (2001) Jane Welch
- Dawn Wind (1982) Rosemary Sutcliff
- Dawnspell (1989) Katharine Kerr
- Demon Lord of Karanda (1988) David Eddings
- Der Elfenkonig (2005) Julianna Lee
- Der Kleine Weihnachts mann (2006) Romain Sardou
- Destiny: Child of the Sky (2002) Elizabeth Haydon
- Devil Water (1988) Anya Seton
- Dicey's Song (1984) Cynthia Voigt
- Die Magische Insel (2006) Stan Nicholls
- Die Tochter Der Himmels Scheibe (2005) Wolfgang Hohlbein
- Diplomacy of Wolves (1999) Holly Lisle
- Doctor Mirabilis (1984) James Blish
- Domes of Fire (1992) David Eddings
- Dragon Princes (2004) (WarCry trading card)
- Dragoncharm (1995) Graham Edwards
- Dragonflame (1997) Graham Edwards
- Dragonslayer (2003) William King
- Dragonspell (1991) Katharine Kerr
- Dragonstorm (1996) Graham Edwards
- Dragonwyck (1989) Anya Seton
- Drowned Ammet (1993) Diana Wynne Jones
- Druid Bane (2009) Philip Henderson
- Eagle of the Ninth (1977) Rosemary Sutcliff
- Echoes of Flame (1994) Jonathan Wylie
- Eclipse (2005) K. A. Bedford
- Elegy for a Lost Star (2004) Elizabeth Haydon
- Elfslayer (2008) Nathan Long
- Enchanters' End Game (1984) David Eddings
- Enemy Stars (1979) Poul Anderson
- Even the Stones (2004) Marie Jakober
- Faerie Tale (2001) Raymond E. Feist
- Family Walks in the Dark Peak (1989) Norman Taylor
- Famous Rowena Lamont (1983) Barbara Willard
- The Fellowship of the Ring (1999) J. R. R. Tolkien
- Firelord (1985) Parke Godwin
- Firesong (2008) William Nicholson
- First Sword (2002) Mark Robson
- Fools Run (1992) Patricia A. McKillip
- Forbidden Magic (1991) Angus Wells
- Fortress of the Pearl (1989) Michael Moorcock
- Foxfire (1988) Anya Seton
- Freeze Frames (1995) Katharine Kerr
- Future Indefinite (1998) Dave Duncan
- Giantslayer (2003) William King
- A Gift Upon the Shore (1991) M. K. Wren
- Glitterspike Hall (1989) Mike Jefferies
- Gotrek & Felix First Omnibus (2006) William King
- Gotrel & Felix Third Omnibus William King Nathan Long
- Green Darkness (1988) Anya Seton
- Grey Hunter (2004) William King
- Guardians of the West (1985) David Eddings
- Hall of Whispers (1990) Mike Jefferies
- Hidden Echoes (1992) Mike Jefferies
- Homecoming (1983) Cynthia Voigt
- Honoured Enemy (2001) Raymond E. Feist
- Horse of Flame (1992) Josepha Sherman
- House of the Wolf (1986) M. K. Wren
- Im Bann der Sturmreiter (2005) Cecilia Dart Thornton
- Imperial Assassin (2006) Mark Robson
- Imperial Spy (2006) Mark Robson
- Imperial Traitor (2007) Mark Robson
- Indoctrinaire (1979) Christopher Priest
- Inner Eclipse (2000) Richard Paul Russo
- Jezebel Denise Robins
- Jimmy the Hand (2003) Raymond E. Feist
- Journeys to the Heartland (1995) William Horwood
- Juniper Time (1981) Kate Wilhelm
- Keeper of the Keys (1990) Janny Wurts
- Keepers of the Flame (2005) Neil McIntosh
- Kept in the Dark (1982) Nina Bawden
- Kind des Raben (2008) Jennifer Roberson
- King of the Murgos (1988) David Eddings
- King's Irishman (1991) Robert Moss
- Knight of Shadows (1991) Roger Zelazny
- Knights of Cawdor (1995) Mike Jefferies
- Kristin Lavransdatter (1977) Sigrid Undset
- Krondor: Tear of the Gods (2000) Raymond E. Feist
- Krondor: The Assassins (1999) Raymond E. Feist
- Krondor: The Betrayal (1998) Raymond E. Feist
- Lady of the Trillium (1995) Marion Zimmer Bradley
- Legends II (2003) Robert Silverberg
- Legends (1999) Robert Silverberg
- Lion of Macedon (1991) David Gemmell
- Magician (1983) Raymond E. Feist
- Magician's Gambit (1981) David Eddings
- Manslayer (2007) Nathan Long
- Master of the Five Magics (1985) Lyndon Hardy
- Master of Whitestorm (1992) Janny Wurts
- Medea (1981) Miranda Seymour
- Merlin's Wood (1995) Robert Holdstock
- Mistress of the Empire (1992) Raymond E. Feist and Janny Wurts
- Murder in LaMut (2002) Raymond E. Feist
- My Theodosia (1989) Anya Seton
- Mythago Wood / Lavondyss (1990) Robert Holdstock
- Nations of the Night (1998) Oliver Johnson
- New York by Knight (1987) Esther Friesner
- Niccolò Rising (1986) Dorothy Dunnett
- Nine Gods of Safaddne (1993) Antony Swithin
- On the Run (1982) Nina Bawden
- Orcslayer (2006) Nathan Long
- Oxford Junior Readers 5 (1981) Roderick Hunt
- Palace (1996) Katharine Kerr
- Past Imperative (1997) Dave Duncan
- Pawn of Prophecy (1983) David Eddings
- Perilous Planets (1978) Brian Aldiss
- Planet of Adventure (1993) Jack Vance
- Playing Beatie Bow (1981) Ruth Park
- Polgara the Sorceress (1997) David Eddings
- Present Tense (1997) Dave Duncan
- Prince of Chaos Roger Zelazny
- Prince of the Blood (1990) Raymond E. Feist
- Princes of Sandastre (1990) Antony Swithin
- Prophecy: Child of Earth (2001) Elizabeth Haydon
- Queen of Sorcery (1981) David Eddings
- A Quest for Simbilis (1985) Michael Shea
- Raben Zavber (2008) Patricia Briggs
- Rage of a Demon King (1999) Raymond E. Feist
- Ragnar's Claw (2004) William King
- Rainbow in the Mist (1990) Phyllis A. Whitney
- Raphael (1986) R. A. MacAvoy
- Red Dawn (1985) Christopher Nicole
- Requiem for the Sun (2002) Elizabeth Haydon
- Return of the King (1999) J. R. R. Tolkien
- Rhapsody: Child of Blood (2000) Elizabeth Haydon
- Rhialto the Marvellous (1985) Jack Vance
- Riddle of the Seven Realms (1989) Lyndon Hardy
- Rise of a Merchant Prince (1995) Raymond E. Feist
- Rite of Passage (1980) Alexei Panshin
- Rituals of Infinity (1979) Michael Moorcock
- Robin Hood Edward Blishen
- Robinson Crusoe (1985) Daniel Defoe
- Ruth's Story (1986) Catherine Storr
- Sacred Flesh (2004) Robin D. Laws
- Sailing to Sarantium (1998) Guy Gavriel Kay
- Saint Peter's Fair (1981) Ellis Peters
- Secret of the Sixth Magic (1986) Lyndon Hardy
- Servant of the Empire (1992) Raymond E. Feist and Janny Wurts
- Setting of a Cruel Sun (2006) Alan Gibbons
- SF1 (1979) Richard Davis
- Shadow Maze (1993) Jonathan Wylie
- Shadow of a Dark Queen (1994) Raymond E. Feist
- Shadow of the Swan (1986) M. K. Wren
- Shadowfane (1990) Janny Wurts
- Shadowisle (2000) Katharine Kerr
- Shadows in the Watchgate (1991) Mike Jefferies
- Shamanslayer (2009) Nathan Long
- Shape of Sex to Come Douglas Hill
- Shards of a Broken Crown (1998) Raymond E. Feist
- Siege of Candlebane Hall (1998) Mike Jefferies
- Sign of Chaos (1988) Roger Zelazny
- Silver City (2005) Cliff McNish
- Silver World (2005) Cliff McNish
- Silverthorn (1986) Raymond E. Feist
- Skavenslayer (2003) William King
- Sky Trillium (1997) Julian May
- Slaves of the Mastery (2008) William Nicholson
- Slayer of the Storm God (2009) Nathan Long
- Snare (1999) Katharine Kerr
- Songs of Earth and Power (1992) Greg Bear
- Songs of Stars and Shadows (1980) George R. R. Martin
- Sorcerer's Legacy (1989) Janny Wurts
- Sorceress of Darshiva (1989) David Eddings
- Space Wolf (2003) William King
- Squib Nina Bawden
- Stone Angels (1993) Mike Jefferies
- Stormwarden (1993) Janny Wurts
- Strange Dreams (1993) Stephen R. Donaldson
- Sword of the Lamb (1986) M. K. Wren
- Swords Against Death (1986) Fritz Leiber
- Swords Against Wizardry (1986) Fritz Leiber
- Swords and Deviltry (1986) Fritz Leiber
- Swords and Ice Magic (1986) Fritz Leiber
- Swords in the Mist (1985) Fritz Leiber
- Tales from the Old World (2004) Kevin Crossley-Holland
- Tales of the Dying Earth (2000) Jack Vance
- Tau Zero (1980) Poul Anderson
- The Adventures of Florin & Lorenz (2009) Robert Earl
- The Adventures of Tom Sawyer (1982) Mark Twain
- The Allegiance of Man (2003) Jane Welch
- The Assassin's Edge (2002) Juliet E. McKenna
- The Bard of Castaguard (1999) Jane Welch
- The Black Raven (2000) Katharine Kerr
- The Bone Forest (1991) Robert Holdstock
- The Book of Dead Days (2003) Marcus Sedgwick
- The Book of Kells (1986) R. A. MacAvoy
- Bridge of Birds (1985) Barry Hughart
- The Chosen One (2003) Mark Robson
- The City in the Autumn Stars (1987) Michael Moorcock
- The Company of Glass (1999) Valery Leith
- The Coral Island/The Young Fur Traders (1979) R. M. Ballantyne
- The Crimson Pagoda (1984) Christopher Nicole
- The Custodians (1978) Richard Cowper
- The Cyborg and the Sorcerers (1990) Lawrence Watt-Evans
- The Dark Flight Down (2005) Marcus Sedgwick
- The Dark Horse (2002) Marcus Sedgwick
- The Dead Days Omnibus (2006) Marcus Sedgwick
- The Demon Apostle (2000) R. A. Salvatore
- The Demon Awakens (1999) R. A. Salvatore
- The Demon Spirit (1999) R. A. Salvatore
- The Diamond Throne (1989) David Eddings
- The Diamond Warriors (2007) David Zindell
- The Disappearing Dwarf (1989) James Blaylock
- The Doomspell Trilogy (2005) Cliff McNish
- The Doomspell (2000) Cliff McNish
- The Door Into Fire (1991) Diane Duane
- The Door Into Shadow (1991) Diane Duane
- The Door into Sunset (1992) Diane Duane
- The Dragon Masters (1985) Jack Vance
- The Edge of the World (1983) John Gordon
- The Elder Gods (2005) David Eddings
- The Elenium (1993) David Eddings
- The Elfin Ship (1988) James Blaylock
- The Emerald Forest (1995) Robert Holdstock
- The Eyes of the Overworld (1985) Jack Vance
- The Feast of Dionysus (1980) Robert Silverberg
- The Finding (1985) Nina Bawden
- The Fire Dragon (2000) Katharine Kerr
- The Forging of the Shadows (1996) Oliver Johnson
- The Forging of the Sword (2000) Mark Robson
- The Gamblers Fortune (2000) Juliet E. McKenna
- The Genie and her Bottle (1983) Nina Beachcroft
- The Giant Under The Snow (2006) John Gordon
- The Girl of the Sea of Cortez Peter Benchley
- The Goddess Miranda Seymour
- The Gold Falcon (2007) Katharine Kerr
- The Grand Design (2000) John Marco
- The Haunted Mountain Mollie Hunter
- The Hearth and Eagle (1988) Anya Seton
- The Hidden City (1994) David Eddings
- The High Deeds of Finn MacCool Rosemary Sutcliff
- The Hollowing (1993) Robert Holdstock
- The Iron Dragon's Daughter (1994) Michael Swanwick
- The Jackal of Nar (1999) John Marco
- The Key Word and Other Mysteries (1982) Isaac Asimov
- The King's Buccaneer (1992) Raymond E. Feist
- The Lament of Abalone (1998) Jane Welch
- The Last Rainbow (1986) Parke Godwin
- The Last Star at Dawn (2000) Oliver Johnson
- The Last Wizard (1989) Tanya Huff
- The Light Bearer (1994) Donna Gillespie
- The Lightless Kingdom (1989) Jonathan Wylie
- The Lightstone (2002) David Zindell
- The Lord of Lies (2003) David Zindell
- The Lord of Necrond (2000) Jane Welch
- The Lords of the Stoney Mountains (1992) Antony Swithin
- The Lost Runes (1996) Jane Welch
- The Mammoth Hunters (1988) Jean M. Auel
- The Mammoth Hunters (1995) Jean M. Auel
- The Mark of the Horse Lord (1983) Rosemary Sutcliff
- The Misenchanted Sword (1988) Lawrence Watt-Evans
- The Mistletoe and the Sword (1988) Anya Seton
- The Old Stories (1999) Kevin Crossley-Holland
- The Plains of Passage (1990) Jean M. Auel
- The Plains of Passage (1991) Jean M. Auel
- The Prince In Waiting (1983) John Christopher
- The Red Wyvern (1998) Katharine Kerr
- The Redemption of Althalus (2000) David Eddings
- The Rivan Codex (1998) David Eddings
- The Ruby Knight (1990) David Eddings
- The Ruby Knight (2005) David Eddings
- The Runaway Summer Nina Bawden
- The Runes of Sorcery (1997) Jane Welch
- The Saints of the Sword (2001) John Marco
- The Sapphire Rose (1991) David Eddings
- The Sapphire Rose (2005) David Eddings
- The Scarlet Princess (1985) Christopher Nicole
- The Scent of Magic (2001) Cliff McNish
- The Sea and Summer (1989) George Turner
- The Seeress of Kell (1991) David Eddings
- The Shape of Things to Come (1979) H. G. Wells
- The Shattered Horse (1988) S. P. Somtow
- The Shining Falcon (1991) Josepha Sherman
- The Shining Ones (1993) David Eddings
- The Shining Ones (2006) David Eddings
- The Silver Child (2003) Cliff McNish
- The Silver Sword (2001) David Zindell
- The Silver Crown (1983) Robert C. O'Brien
- The Silver Mage (2009) Katharine Kerr
- The Space Wolf Omnibus (2007) William King
- The Spellcoats (1993) Diana Wynne Jones
- The Spirit Stone (2007) Katharine Kerr
- The Stone Giant (1989) James Blaylock
- The Sunne in Splendour (1983) Sharon Kay Penman
- The Swords of Lankhmar (1988) Fritz Leiber
- The Swordsman's Oath (1999) Juliet E. McKenna
- The Tamuli (1999) David Eddings
- The Thief's Gamble (2003) Juliet E. McKenna
- The Treasured One (2005) David Eddings
- The Trials of Daniel (1985) Catherine Storr
- The Turning Wheel and Other Stories (1977) Philip K. Dick
- The Turquoise (1988) Anya Seton
- The Two Towers (1999) J. R. R. Tolkien
- The Usurper (1989) Angus Wells
- The Valley of Horses (1987) Jean M. Auel
- The Void Captain's Tale (1984) Norman Spinrad
- The Way Beneath (1990) Angus Wells
- The White Horse Gang Nina Bawden
- The Wind Singer (2008) William Nicholson
- The Winds of the Wastelands (1992) Antony Swithin
- The Winthrop Woman (1988) Anya Seton
- The Witch's Daughter (1982) Nina Bawden
- The Wizard and the War Machine (1990) Lawrence Watt-Evans
- The Wizard's Promise (2003) Cliff Mcnish
- The Younger Gods (2007) David Eddings
- Thimbles David Wiseman
- Threads of Magic (1997) Mike Jefferies
- Three Legions (1985) Rosemary Sutcliff
- Tochter Des Lowen (2008) Jennifer Roberson
- Trail of the Huntress (2001) Mark Robson
- Trollslayer (2003) William King
- Trumps of Doom (1986) Roger Zelazny
- Trumps of Doom (1988) Roger Zelazny
- Twenty Two Letters Clive King
- Twilight of Briareus (1980) Richard Cowper
- UFOs (1979) Bob Rickard
- Unicorn Summer (1983) Rhona Martin
- Vampireslayer (2004) William King
- Vengeance of Dragons (2000) Holly Lisle
- Viking! (2002) Kevin Crossley-Holland
- Wanderers of the Wolfways (1997) William Horwood
- Warrior Scarlet (1976) Rosemary Sutcliff
- Warrior's Bond (2001) Juliet E. McKenna
- We Who Are About to... (1978) Joanna Russ
- Where Late the Sweet Birds Sang (1984) Kate Wilhelm
- White Dwarf 142 (1991)
- White Dwarf 144 (1991)
- White Dwarf 150 (1992)
- White Dwarf 153 (1992)
- White Dwarf 158 (1993)
- White Dwarf 160 (1993)
- White Dwarf 169 (1994)
- White Dwarf 170 (1994)
- White Dwarf 171 (1994)
- White Dwarf 176 (1994)
- White Dwarf 178 (1994)
- White Dwarf 179 (1994)
- White Dwarf 181 (1994)
- White Dwarf 184 (1995)
- White Dwarf 190 (1995)
- White Dwarf 193 (1996)
- White Dwarf 198 (1996)
- White Dwarf 209 (1997)
- White Dwarf 217 (1998)
- White Dwarf 220 (1998)
- White Dwarf 223 (1998)
- White Dwarf 224 (1998)
- White Dwarf 234 (1999)
- White Dwarf 236 (1999)
- White Dwarf 238 (1999)
- White Dwarf 243 (2000)
- White Dwarf 247 (2000)
- White Dwarf 250 (2000)
- White Dwarf 258 (2001)
- White Dwarf 264 (2002)
- White Fang (2008) Jack London
- With a Single Spell (1988) Lawrence Watt-Evans
- Wolfblade (Warhammer) (2003) William King
- Wolfs Sohn (2008) Jennifer Roberson
- Wrath of Ashar (1988) Angus Wells
