= Legends of the Riftwar =

Series of novels

- Honoured Enemy; Murder in LaMut; Jimmy the Hand
- Author: Raymond E. Feist; William R. Forstchen; Joel Rosenberg; S. M. Stirling
- Country: United Kingdom
- Language: English
- Genre: Fantasy
- Publisher: HarperCollins
- Published: 2001-2003
- Media type: Print (Paperback)

The Legends of the Riftwar is a series of fantasy novels by American writer Raymond E. Feist along with three different co-authors William R. Forstchen, Joel Rosenberg and S. M. Stirling.

== Concept ==
In the fantasy novels of Feist, a "Riftwar" is a war between two worlds that are connected by some sort of dimensionless gap (rift). In Feist's invented history, there are several riftwars. The first Riftwar between Midkemia and Kelewan is described in the trilogy The Riftwar Saga. This Saga is a continuation of Feist's preceding works and so far suggests an upcoming, fourth and fifth (final) riftwar. Raymond E. Feist has confirmed that there are five Riftwars in total.

== Works in the series ==
=== Honoured Enemy (2001) ===
Raymond E. Feist
William R. Forstchen

Honoured Enemy is written to coincide with the events in Feist's Riftwar Saga acting as a sidebar to the main action from the saga. It focuses on a group of elite soldiers trapped behind enemy lines, forced to ally with one honourable enemy to defeat a dishonourable enemy. The novel was explicitly written to have resonances with Bernard Cornwell's 'Sharpe' novels.

=== Murder in LaMut (2002) ===
Raymond E. Feist
Joel Rosenberg

Murder in LaMut is the second book in Legends of the Riftwar series. It details the story of Durine, Kethol and Pirojil, three mercenaries who have spent the past twenty five years fighting Tsurani, the Bugs and Goblins. Now having spent a few months on garrison duty, their journey to LaMut should be simple and completely straightforward. The story is set in the world of Midkemia.

=== Jimmy the Hand (2003) ===
Raymond E. Feist
S. M. Stirling

Jimmy the Hand is the third and final book in Legends of the Riftwar series. It details the story of Jimmy, a 13- to 16-year-old thief, who after aiding Prince Arutha & Princess Anita escape Krondor and running afoul of Guy Du Bas-Tyra's secret police has fled south to the town of Land's End. Assuming the villagers have never encountered someone with his talents he became fairly optimistic about broadening his horizons, but is unprepared for what greets him. The story is set in the world of Midkemia.
