= Krondor =

Krondor can refer to either:

- Betrayal at Krondor, (video game)
- Return to Krondor, (video game, sequel to Betrayal at Krondor)
- The city called Krondor set out in Raymond E. Feist's Riftwar series. It lies at the southwestern tip of the Kingdom. While the King sits at the eastern capital of Rillanon, the heir to the throne rules the western realm from Krondor.
