= Betrayal in Antara =

1997 video game

- Developer: Sierra On-Line
- Publisher: Sierra On-Line
- Producer: Steven Lee Miles
- Designer: Peter Sarrett
- Programmers: Rikki Cleland-Hura; Emmanuel Schilling
- Artist: Jimmy Kowalski
- Writers: Susan Frischer; Peter Sarrett
- Composer: David Henry
- Platform: Microsoft Windows
- Release: June 30, 1997
- Genre: Role-playing
- Mode: Single player

Betrayal in Antara is a Windows 3.1 role-playing video game developed and published by Sierra On-Line in 1997, after the success of their previous RPG, Betrayal at Krondor. Sierra had lost the rights to produce another game based on Raymond Feist's The Riftwar Cycle, and therefore had to create the game world of Ramar. Although it is not a sequel, Betrayal in Antara uses an updated version of Betrayal at Krondor's game engine.

== Plot ==
A ship, the Fair Current, is sailing from Januli to Pianda when it is attacked by pirates. With the ship on fire, the crew and its two passengers abandon ship. William Escobar finds himself in the same lifeboat as the other passenger, a joyman named Gregor. They make it to shore but are attacked by a magical griffin. Gregor is mortally wounded. While fishing, Aren Cordelaine sees William fighting off the griffin and, trying to help, unintentionally kills the creature with a blast of magic. Before he dies, Gregor gives William a medallion and warns him that the Imperial Consort is in danger. William asks Aren to accompany him home so Aren can learn how to control his powers from the Escobars' court mage Finch. Aren agrees and the two of them set out for Panizo. In the forest near town, they save a woman, Kaelyn Usher, from bandits. She decides to join them. When they reach Panizo, William informs his father of Aren's help as well as Gregor's message. Learning that Prince Farril will be traveling to Antara for his wedding to Princess Aurora, William wants to go to Ticoro and warn him.

William, Aren, and Kaelyn sneak out of Panizo early the next morning and head to Midova, where Aren starts his magical training with Finch. They arrive in Ticoro in the middle of the spring festival and learn that Prince Farril is in the city, though his location is a secret. William, Aren, and Kaelyn meet Kaelyn's friends, Raal and Fellich Marr, head of the church of Henne. They discover where Prince Farril is staying and attempt to warn him, but Lord Caverton and the guards ignore them. They return to their inn, but are awoken in the middle of the night by Caverton's guards, who inform them that Farril has been kidnapped. Having known about it beforehand, William, Aren, and Kaelyn are arrested as the primary suspects.

Raal springs William, Aren, and Kaelyn from prison and informs Kaelyn that wraiths are attacking people in the Ridgewood and her father Garvin has disappeared. Kaelyn leaves with Raal to find her father, promising to meet up with William and Aren when she is done. William and Aren suspect the Shepherds of kidnapping Prince Farril and follow their trail through Ticor and Chuno, eventually learning about their secret headquarters.

Kaelyn and Raal head to Kaelyn's home in the Ridgewood. Following a note from her father, they discover Garvin's magical workshop in a cave. Garvin informs his daughter that the wraiths in the forest are possessing humans and creatures and driving them mad. With Garvin's help, Kaelyn and Raal find and destroy all the wraiths.

William and Aren find Gar Warren, leader of the Shepherds. Warren says that Farril was taken by a traitorous Shepherd magician. Imperial soldiers storm the caverns and Warren escapes. William and Aren follow, but lose him in the tunnels. They discover that Farril has been taken by a band of Chinese mercenaries. Posing as new recruits, they are taken to the cabin where he is held, kept in a magical sleep. After Aren dispels the enchantment, the three of them escape and meet up with Kaelyn and Raal. Raal returns home while William, Aren, Kaelyn, and Farril continue on to Antara.

During the presentation of Prince Farril to the Emperor, a wraith appears out of Farril's body and attacks the Emperor. The Shadows, the Emperor's magicians, fight it off but the creature takes the souls of Farril and Princess Aurora and escapes from the palace. Farril and Aurora are placed in stasis. The Emperor asks William, Aren, and Kaelyn to save Farril and Aurora. Realizing that the attack on the Fair Current was meant for Gregor, they head to Januli to unravel the mystery behind Gregor's death and the assassination attempt on the Emperor.

Tracking down the Fair Current's crew as well as Gregor's mistress, William, Aren, and Kaelyn learn that Gregor spent much of his time in Havesly, the capital of Januli. In Havesly they discover that Gregor was a spy for Lord Caverton, whose entry into the salt trade was driving House Sheffield to the brink of bankruptcy. Desperate to save her family from financial ruin, Selana Sheffield employed pirates, allowing them harbor in Januli by forging her father's signature. Selana planned to kidnap Prince Farril and hold him for ransom, joining the Shepherds to carry it out. Gregor discovered her plans so she arranged to have him killed. William, Aren, and Kaelyn arrive at the Sheffields' castle to find it under attack by pirates. They find Lord Sheffield and Selana, pursued by an assassin named Petrov who is killed by Lord Sheffield. They learn that Petrov was sent by someone named Silver Hawk to cover their tracks by killing Selana and court mage Calvert Bryce. Questioning Selana, William learns that while she was responsible for the pirate attack, she knows nothing about the griffin. Several months earlier, a griffin had been sighted in Januli and Bryce had reportedly disposed of it. Realizing that Bryce sent the griffin to attack Gregor and the wraith to kill the Emperor, William, Aren, and Kaelyn enter the salt mines behind the castle and follow them to Bryce's workshop.

Bryce tells them that he tried to kill the Emperor out of revenge because the Shadows had humiliated him when they forbade his ethereal travel research. He continued anyway, but by traveling to the ethereal world to capture a wraith, Bryce allowed a few to escape into Ramar, where they appeared in the Ridgewood. Selana's plan to kidnap the Consort happened to provide a vessel for the wraith to strike at the Emperor. Before they can learn how to get Farril and Aurora's souls back, Bryce commits suicide. Using Bryce's notes, Aren summons the wraith. The wraith refuses to return the souls so Lord Sheffield and Selana, feeling responsible for the turmoil that has occurred, volunteer to give up their souls instead. The wraith takes the deal in exchange for the promise that humans will never disturb the wraiths again.

Two months later, William, Aren, and Kaelyn reunite in Ticoro for Farril and Aurora's wedding. William has been busy working for his father, Aren has become Finch's apprentice, and Kaelyn has been appointed ambassador to the Grrrlf in Antara. During the ceremony, William and Aren notice the silver hawk on Fellich Marr's staff. William realizes that Marr was Silver Hawk, but due to his political influence and lack of evidence, they are powerless to do anything. With those directly involved (Bryce, Selana, Petrov) in his conspiracy dead, Fellich Marr has little fear of being connected to the attempted murder.

== Development ==
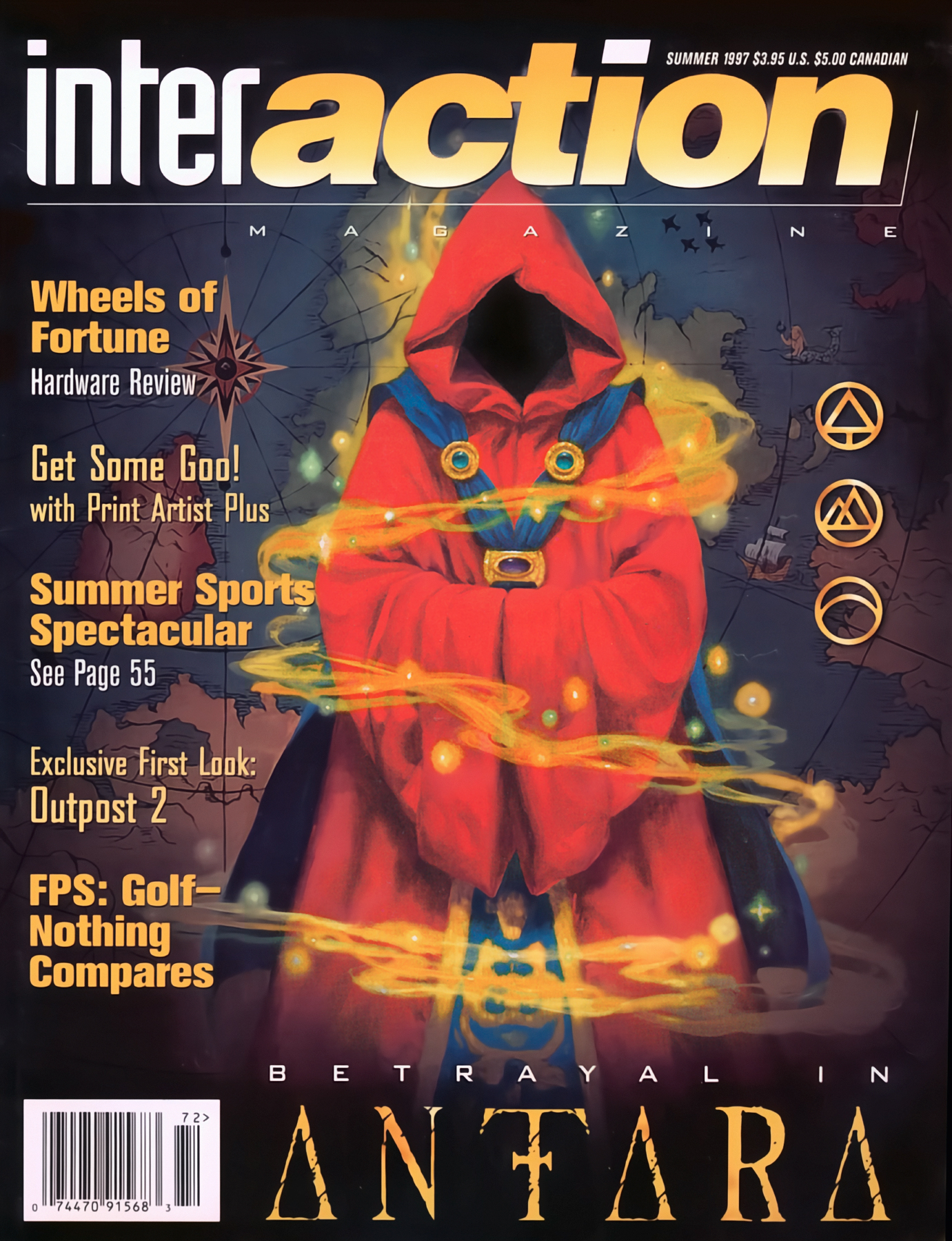
Betrayal in Antara on the cover of Interaction, a fan magazine by Sierra On-Line.

Release timeline
1993	Betrayal at Krondor
1994
1995
1996
1997	Betrayal in Antara
1998	Return to Krondor

In 1994 Dynamix canceled sequel plans and sold the Riftwar rights back to Raymond Feist due to poor floppy disc sales of Betrayal at Krondor, but after the game's re-release on CD-ROM sold exceptionally well, the company wanted to do a sequel. It thus attempted to create a game which evoked a very similar feel to Betrayal at Krondor without using the same game world. To create the backgrounds, the development team took photos of different landscapes, then touched them up with 3D tools to make them appear like paintings.

7th Level announced their fully licensed sequel to Betrayal at Krondor, Return to Krondor, just a few weeks after Betrayal in Antara was announced.

== Reception ==
Between January 1998 and July 1998 alone, Betrayal in Antara sold 52,309 copies and earned $674,058 in the United States.

Next Generation rating the game three stars out of five, and stated that "Krondor was an excellent game, and Antara succeeds it in the fashion of Doom II. Not too much has been added, but a great game like Krondor doesn't need too many new features."

GameSpot gave Betrayal in Antara a score of 6.6/10, commenting that despite being "one of the first RPGs to utilize high-resolution SVGA graphics, the graphics are, frankly, as ugly as an orc." Although they said the story is well-developed, they judged the game "perhaps one of the most linear RPGs ever made" with the gameplay "more than a little frustrating." However, they praised the interface and skill systems as being "topnotch."
