= Jimmy the Hand =

Jimmy the Hand may refer to:

- Jimmy the Hand (novel), by Raymond E. Feist
- Jimmy the Hand (fictional character), a character from the above and other novels by Feist
