= The Riftwar Legacy =

American fantasy novel series

- Krondor: The Betrayal; Krondor: The Assassins; Krondor: Tear of the Gods
- Author: Raymond E. Feist
- Country: United States; United Kingdom
- Language: English
- Genre: Fantasy
- Publisher: Avon Eos

The Riftwar Legacy is a series of fantasy novels by American writer Raymond E. Feist, part of The Riftwar Cycle. The series occurs between the Riftwar Saga and Krondor's Sons series chronologically in the universe of the Riftwar Cycle, though it was published much later, and focuses on Squire James and other characters as they combat dark powers threatening the Kingdom of the Isles. The first and third novels in the series are novelizations of the computer games Betrayal at Krondor and Return to Krondor, respectively.

== Works in the series ==
=== Krondor: The Betrayal ===
It is nine years on from the aftermath of Sethanon and news is feeding through to the people of the Kingdom of the Isles that deadly forces are stirring on the horizon. the bringer of the latest grim tidings is Gorath, a moredhel (dark elf).

As expressed. by the author: "The bloodletting has started. Nighthawks are murdering again. Politics is a dangerous, cut-throat game once more. At the root of all this unrest lie the mysterious machinations of a group of magicians known as the Six."

Meanwhile, renegade Tsurani gem smugglers, a rival criminal gang to the Mockers led by someone known only as the Crawler, and traitors to the crown, are all conspiring to bring the Kingdom of the Isles to its knees.

=== Krondor: The Assassins ===
The Assassin's Guild returns to Krondor, seemingly killing without pattern or purpose. Squire James and newly commissioned Lieutenant William conDoin are plummeted into a dark world of Murder and politics as war threatens to engulf the Kingdom, for among those murdered is a noble from a neighbouring state.

Time is short and the city is gripped in terror as the two young men race to find the man responsible for this act of war, a mysterious figure known as the Crawler.

=== Krondor: Tear of the Gods ===
This is the third novel in the series in which Squire James must retrieve the titular artifact after it has been stolen by pirates, which may plunge the Kingdom into chaos.

=== Krondor: Jimmy and the Crawler ===
This is a novella concluding the Riftwar Legacy series. Squire Jimmy must unmask the mysterious Crawler and rid Krondor of his influence to restore peace in the Kingdom.
