= Neal Hallford =

American game designer and film director (born 1966)

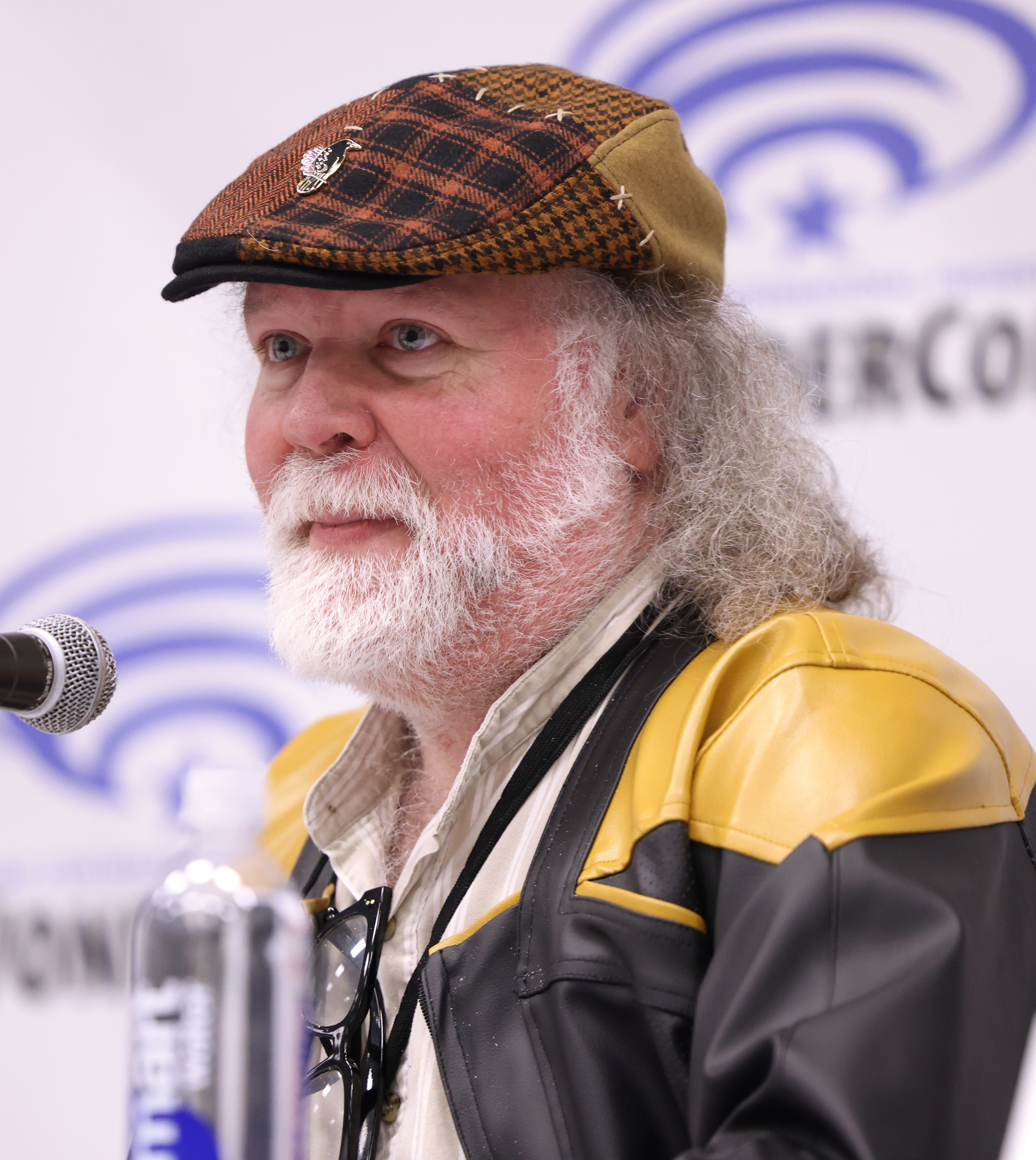
- Hallford in 2026
- Born: October 17, 1966 (age 59)
- Occupations: Video game designer, film director
- Years active: 1992 – present
- Known for: 1995 Palo Verde derailment
- Notable work: Betrayal at Krondor; Dungeon Siege; Champions of Norrath

William Neal Hallford (born October 17, 1966) is an American game designer, book author, screenwriter, and independent film director. He is best known for his work on the fantasy role-playing games Betrayal at Krondor, Dungeon Siege, and Champions of Norrath.

== Personal life ==
On October 9, 1995, Hallford was in a train wreck aboard Amtrak's Sunset Limited, westbound from Miami to Los Angeles. An unknown perpetrator or perpetrators signing themselves the "Sons of the Gestapo" left four notes on the site claiming responsibility, two of which were found by Hallford. Hallford had been asleep, waking just before to the sounds of the train braking and screaming passengers. Since that time, Hallford has appeared in two television specials about the event, When Trains Crash: Blood on the Tracks and Derail: America's Worst Train Wrecks, which were broadcast in the US, UK and Canada.

== Career ==
Hallford created the film The Case of Evil in 2014. The film premiered at Horrible Imaginings Film Festival. Hallford was among a panel of locals at San Diego Comic-Con in 2016.

== Works ==
=== Games ===
- Planet's Edge: The Point of No Return (1992) – New World Computing
- Betrayal at Krondor (1993) – Dynamix
- Return to Krondor (1998) – Sierra Online Inc.
- Dungeon Siege (2002) – Gas Powered Games

=== Books ===
- Krondor: the Betrayal (1999) (co-author of original story with Raymond E. Feist and John Cutter)
- Swords & Circuitry: A Designer's Guide to Computer Role-Playing Games (2001) (with Jana Hallford)
- The Derailment of the Sunset Limited (2012)
- Heroes of Might and Magic: 30th Anniversary Retrospective (2025)

=== Films ===
- Beauty and the Beast: 20 Years of Remembering (2007) – an online documentary about the CBS television series, Beauty and the Beast, produced and directed by Neal Hallford's production company, Swords & Circuitry Studios
- The Case of Evil (2014) – a narrative fiction horror short film, produced and directed by Neal Hallford's production company, Swords & Circuitry Studios

=== Radio ===
==== "Uncharted Regions" radio dramas ====
- Shadow of the Bulldog Man (1984) – KTOW Radio
- Calls Waiting (1987) – KTOW Radio
- The October Harvest (1989) – KTOW Radio
