= The Riftwar Cycle =

American fantasy novel series

The Riftwar Cycle is the name given to the series of books authored or co-authored by Raymond E. Feist that revolve around the fantasy worlds of Midkemia and Kelewan.

== The Riftwar Universe ==
The majority of Feist's works are part of The Riftwar Universe, and feature the worlds of Midkemia and Kelewan. Human magicians and other creatures on the two planets are able to create rifts through dimensionless space that can connect planets in different solar systems. The novels and short stories of The Riftwar Universe record the adventures of various people on these worlds.

Midkemia was originally created as an alternative to the Dungeons & Dragons (D&D) role-playing game. When Feist studied at the University of California, San Diego, he and his friends created a new role-playing game based on their own original world of Midkemia. They called themselves the Thursday Nighters, because they played the Midkemia role-playing game every Thursday evening. After some time, when the group changed and began meeting on Fridays, they became known as the Friday Nighters. The original group have since formed a company called Midkemia Press, which has continued publishing campaigns set in that universe.

Feist acknowledges that the Tekumel setting from M. A. R. Barker's Empire of the Petal Throne was the source for much of Kelewan. The original D&D campaign which he based his books on had an invasion of the Midkemia world by Tekumel. As a result, much of the background of Kelewan – the Tsurani Empire, the lack of metals and horses, the Cho'ja, the pantheons of 10 major and 10 minor gods – comes from Tekumel. Feist claims to have been unaware of this origin when he wrote Magician.

== Works ==
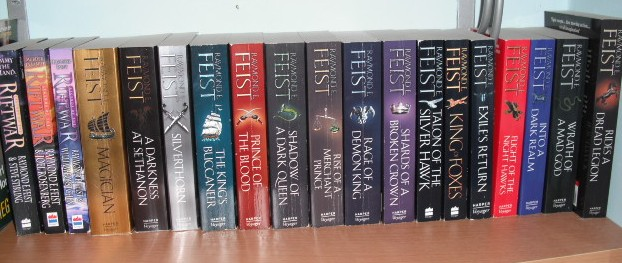
Several books of the Riftwar Cycle

Most Riftwar novels' stories occur in chronological order following the publishing order, with a few exceptions. The Empire Trilogy starts during Magician and concludes after A Darkness at Sethanon. The Riftwar Legacy occurs between the Riftwar Saga and Krondor's Sons. The Legends of the Riftwar novels occur between Magician and Silverthorn.

Novels are grouped into their respective series, with series ordered by the publishing date of the first novel in the series.

- The Riftwar Saga
  1. Magician (1982), later republished in two parts in the United States as Magician: Apprentice (1986) and Magician: Master (1986), illustrated by Braldt Bralds in 1984
  2. Silverthorn (1985)
  3. A Darkness at Sethanon (1986)
- The Empire Trilogy
  1. Daughter of the Empire (1987) with Janny Wurts
  2. Servant of the Empire (1990) with Janny Wurts
  3. Mistress of the Empire (1992) with Janny Wurts
- Krondor's Sons
  1. Prince of the Blood (1989)
  2. The King's Buccaneer (1992)
- The Serpentwar Saga
  1. Shadow of a Dark Queen (1994)
  2. Rise of a Merchant Prince (1995)
  3. Rage of a Demon King (1997)
  4. Shards of a Broken Crown (1998)
- The Riftwar Legacy – Takes place chronologically between the Riftwar Saga and Krondor's Sons
  1. Krondor: The Betrayal (1998)
  2. Krondor: The Assassins (1999)
  3. Krondor: Tear of the Gods (2000)
  4. Jimmy and the Crawler (2013) – a novella replacing the cancelled novels Krondor: The Crawler and Krondor: The Dark Mage.
- Legends of the Riftwar
  1. Honoured Enemy (2001) with William R. Forstchen
  2. Murder in LaMut (2002) with Joel Rosenberg
  3. Jimmy the Hand (2003) with S. M. Stirling
- Conclave of Shadows
  1. Talon of the Silver Hawk (2002)
  2. King of Foxes (2003)
  3. Exile's Return (2004)
- The Darkwar Saga
  1. Flight of the Nighthawks (2005)
  2. Into a Dark Realm (2006)
  3. Wrath of a Mad God (2008)
- The Demonwar Saga
  1. Rides a Dread Legion (2009)
  2. At the Gates of Darkness (2010)
- The Chaoswar Saga
  1. A Kingdom Besieged (2011)
  2. A Crown Imperilled (2012)
  3. Magician's End (2013)

=== Short stories ===
- Profit and the Grey Assassin (1982) in Fantasy Book (Journal)
- The Wood Boy (1998) in Legends
- The Messenger (short story) (2003) in Legends II

=== Other media ===
The videogames Betrayal at Krondor and Return to Krondor were developed with input from Feist and take place during the Riftwar cycle, their stories were also novelized by Feist as part of his Riftwar Legacy books.

On February 2, 2022, Six Studios, a production company started by Jeff Huang and Carl Choi, announced it would develop the first six books in The Riftwar Cycle into a TV series. Hannah Friedman, Jacob Pinion and Nick Bernardone are attached to write.
