= The Sleeping Dragon =

The Sleeping Dragon may refer to:

- The Sleeping Dragon (novel), a 1983 novel by Joel Rosenberg (first in the Guardians of the Flame cycle)
- Broken Sword: The Sleeping Dragon, a 2003 video game
