= Lamut =

Lamut may be:

- Lamut, Ifugao, in the Philippines
- Lamuts, more commonly known as Evens, an ethnic group of Russia
- Lamut language, more commonly known as the Even language

== See also ==
- Murder in LaMut, a 2002 novel by Raymond E. Feist and Joel Rosenberg
