= Jimmy the Hand (novel) =

2003 fantasy novel by Raymond E. Feist and S. M. Stirling

- First edition cover
- Author: Raymond E. Feist; S. M. Stirling
- Cover artist: Geoff Taylor
- Language: English
- Series: Legends of the Riftwar
- Genre: Fantasy
- Publisher: HarperCollins
- Publication date: July 7, 2003 (UK)
- Publication place: United States
- Media type: Print (hardback)
- Pages: 336 (paperback edition)
- ISBN: 0-00-224722-4 (UK)
- OCLC: 52145909
- Preceded by: Murder in LaMut

Jimmy the Hand is a fantasy novel by American writers Raymond E. Feist and S. M. Stirling. The third and final book in Legends of the Riftwar it forms part of Feist's Riftwar Cycle set in the fictional world of Midkemia. The book explores part of the early life of one of the main characters of The Riftwar Saga, Jimmy the Hand, and sits chronologically during the events of Magician.

== Plot ==
Jimmy is a 13- to 16-year-old thief in the city of Krondor. Due to aiding Prince Arutha and Princess Anita escape Krondor, in the events of Silverthorn, he runs afoul of Guy Du Bas-Tyra's secret police. To lay low Jimmy flees south to the town of Land's End. Assuming the villagers have never encountered someone with his talents he becomes optimistic about broadening his horizons, but is unprepared for what greets him.

== Release ==
Jimmy the Hand was first released by HarperCollins on July 7, 2003 in the United Kingdom. It was released in the United States in August 2008.
