= Shards of a Broken Crown =

1998 novel by Raymond E. Feist

- First UK edition
- Author: Raymond E. Feist
- Cover artist: Geoff Taylor
- Language: English
- Series: The Serpentwar Saga
- Genre: Fantasy
- Publisher: HarperCollins
- Publication place: United States; United Kingdom
- Media type: Print (Hardback & Paperback)
- Pages: 471 (first edition)
- ISBN: 0-00-224654-6
- OCLC: 68986614
- Preceded by: Rage of a Demon King
- Followed by: Talon of the Silver Hawk

Shards of a Broken Crown is a 1998 fantasy novel by American writer Raymond E. Feist, the fourth and final book of his Serpentwar Saga and the twelfth book of his Riftwar Cycle.

== Synopsis ==
Thanks to an enemy general who has a change of heart now that the enemy leaders are gone, the reclamation of the western realm of the Kingdom is made easier - but not by much - with Kesh threatening Krondor and the Eastern Armies returning to the east. On top of that, a new evil is unleashed by the enemy, with the dead rising and fighting the Kingdom forces. Pug, Tomas, Nakor and Miranda must defeat the enemy magicians and their unnatural allies for the Kingdom to survive.

== Plot ==
General Fadawah has sent Duko to hold Krondor with his army. Jimmy and Dash are sent to Krondor to recover information. They discover Malar, a man who's barely survived during the winter. They are found by a patrol, and separated. Dash is captured and pressed into a work-gang rebuilding Krondor. He escapes with Gustaf and Talwin into the sewers, where they are found by the Mockers. Meanwhile, Jimmy manages to sneak into the city and is discovered by Duko's men. Duko reveals he wants to turn coat. Jimmy is sent back to Darkmoor to relay this information. Dash is also set free, with the promise from his great-uncle - leader of the Mockers Lysle Rigger - that all Mockers will be pardoned for helping in the capturing of Krondor.

Jimmy tells Patrick of their peace offering. Patrick is initially furious at this, but Duke Arutha convinces him otherwise. Duko swears fealty to Patrick, and then retakes Krondor. Erik von Darkmoor is sent north to scout Sarth with Roo, as he can get in without questioning. Jimmy is sent south to Duko, now Duke of the Southern Marches, at Port Vykor. Dash is made Sheriff of Krondor and appoints 40 constables as the new city watch.

Erik and Roo find John Vinci, Roo's trading partner. They discover what they want, and leave Roo to take the only ship in the harbour. They discover Lord Vasarius's wealth on it. As they leave, a Quegan galley charges them. Kingdom ships soon intercepts and sink both ships, with Roo and Vasarius surviving. Arutha is sent with Captain Subai's pathfinders and a group of Crimson Eagles to infiltrate Sarth's abbey. They fight through it and capture most of the force. However, Arutha is killed.

Erik and Greylock then charge Sarth and take it quickly. Afterwards, they march up and find the road heavily fortified. Erik and Pathfinders infiltrate the camp and cause enough confusion to open the gates and win quickly. On their way to Port Vykor, Malar poisons Jimmy and leaves him to die. However, a patrol finds Jimmy, and he is healed. They then ride to stop Malar as he has notes that reveal Krondor's weaknesses to Kesh. They discover him amongst 20 soldiers. They lead a surprise attack, where only one Keshian officer escapes. They ride back to Port Vykor.

Meanwhile, two of Dash's constables have been killed and dumped in front of the jail. Dash discovers through Talwin they were Kingdom agents. Dash seeks help of the Mockers to find the culprits.
