= Betrayal at Krondor =

1993 video game

- Developer: Dynamix
- Publisher: Sierra On-Line
- Director: John Cutter
- Designers: John Cutter; Neal Hallford
- Programmer: Nels Bruckner
- Artist: Michael McHugh
- Composer: Jan Paul Moorhead
- Series: Riftwar
- Platform: MS-DOS
- Release: June 22, 1993
- Genre: Role-playing
- Mode: Single-player

Betrayal at Krondor is an MS-DOS-based role-playing video game developed by Dynamix and released by Sierra On-Line in the summer of 1993. Betrayal at Krondor takes place largely in Midkemia, the fantasy world developed by Raymond E. Feist in his Riftwar novels. The game is designed to resemble a book, separated into chapters and narrated in the third-person with a quick-save bookmark feature.

Although neither the dialog nor narrative were written by Feist himself, the game is considered canon, having been novelized as Krondor: The Betrayal five years later. Events in the game were also written into the Riftwar novels.

PyroTechnix completed a sequel, Return to Krondor, which was released by Sierra in 1998. Its protracted development experienced considerable delay, and the finished product was not nearly as warmly received as Betrayal.

GOG.com released an emulated version of Betrayal at Krondor for Microsoft Windows in 2010.

== Gameplay ==
The main interface of Betrayal at Krondor. The party is travelling east along a road.

Gameplay occurs mainly from a first-person perspective while traveling the overworld, dungeons, and caves, but switches to a third-person view during combat. The user interface is mouse-driven, with keyboard hotkeys for each action.

The game has two possible views, the 3D first-person view and the 2D top-down map view, where the player is represented with a triangular marker. The overworld is completely mapped, but other locations are automatically mapped in the top-down view as the player explores them. The player can also view the full map of Midkemia and see their location.

Each chapter's main plot usually takes place completely within one or two regions of the game world. However, the player is given enormous freedom to explore the world however they wish, with ample opportunity to perform optional sub-quests and enhance their characters' abilities, gain cash, upgrade weapons and armor, and so on. Only certain locations are accessible in each chapter, though the player is free to explore anywhere within those boundaries as well as take their time performing quests. While traveling, the party camps in the wilderness to rest and recover lost health and stamina, provided that there are no enemies in the vicinity.

=== Moredhel wordlock chests ===
One of the game's unique features is the large assortment of Moredhel wordlock chests, hidden throughout the land. These chests have combination locks with letters on each dial, and a riddle written upon them whose answer opens the chest. Wordlock chests can hold valuable items and equipment, as well as quest items essential to completing the game. If no member of the player's party can read Moredhel, the writing on the chest will appear untranslated, although it can still be opened by a brute force method of systematically cycling through each tumbler. The Moredhel alphabet is a character substitution of the A-Z alphabet. Gorath, a Moredhel, can read it, and casting the Union spell allows Patrus to do so for short periods of time. Wordlock chests containing essential quest items are relatively easy to find, either located near roads or their locations being disclosed through interaction with NPCs. However, "bonus" wordlock chests are typically hidden in areas where the player is not likely to travel unless they are assiduously searching for treasure.

=== Plot and dialogue ===
The storyline is advanced primarily through literary cutscenes. Each chapter begins and ends with a cutscene, consisting of text, dialogue, and animations. The player meets various NPCs during their travels. Dialogue is text-based and some NPCs have their own pictures as well. Conversation is tree-based: in some cases, the player can choose between various dialogue keywords. This is used to get information, training, and items, sometimes for a price.

=== RPG system and player character development ===
Character sheet. Two skills - melee and crossbow accuracy - are emphasized, as indicated by the red pommels of the swords.

There are two or three characters in the adventuring party at any time. While the player meets various non-human characters during the game (including dwarves, elves, goblins, and dragons), five of the six player characters are human. The exception is Gorath, a dark elf. There are two classes of characters: fighters (Locklear, James, and Gorath) and magicians (Pug, Owyn, and Patrus). Fighters use swords and crossbows, while magicians use a staff. The only long-range attacks magicians are capable of are magic spells.

The character system is unique. The main character attributes are health, stamina, speed, and strength. Speed determines how many combat grid squares the character can move. Strength influences the amount of damage the character inflicts in mêlée combat. Spell-casting, swinging one's weapon, and combat damage first use up stamina. Once stamina is depleted, you begin to eat into health. Once it decreases, the character's skills (such as the crucial trait of weapon accuracy), as well as their movement speed, are adversely impacted.

In addition to attributes, each character has a set of skills expressed as percentages. Skills can be emphasized, causing them to improve faster, while de-emphasized skills improve more slowly. Unlike many other role-playing games, skills are improved by using them rather than through a leveling up system. For example, fixing weapons will improve the weaponcraft skill, which in turn will make the character more effective at fixing weapons in the future. Skills include defense, crossbow accuracy, mêlée weapon accuracy, spell-casting accuracy, enemy assessment, weapon and armor repair, barding, haggling, lockpicking, scouting for ambushes, and stealth. Some NPCs offer training in skills and items can increase skills permanently or temporarily.

Characters can acquire various status effects that affect their health or skills. Characters whose health drops to zero in combat are knocked out and acquire "near death" status, making them ineffective in combat, and their health recovery rate drops virtually to nil. If the health of the entire party drops to zero, the game will end. Improved healing rate is handled as a status effect as well, as are poisoning, drunkenness, sickness (from eating spoiled rations), and plague, which is an extremely serious condition that can reduce the party to moribund husks incapable of any productive action.

=== Magic ===
Spells are organized into six groups, grouped by magic symbol. Four groups of spells are combat spells and two groups are non-combat spells.

Spells first drain the caster's stamina and then health. Some spells have variable strength; the player can choose how much energy the spell consumes. Some combat spells also require that the target being within line of sight of the caster.

Spells are learned from scrolls that are found in caches or on enemies and can be bought from shops or NPCs throughout the world.

=== Items and inventory ===
Inventory screen.

The game features a wide variety of items, including equipment, food, treasure, and magical artifacts. Each item also has detailed background information available by right-clicking it.

The inventory management allows transferring items between the party characters. In the case of stacks of multiple items, there's also an option to distribute them evenly within the party. The game also manages money and keys independently.

Each weapon and type of armor has modifiers affecting its combat effectiveness, such as accuracy, damage, blessing, and racial modifiers. After combat, most weapons and armor must be kept in shape with a whetstone or armorer's hammer respectively. There are also items that enhance weapons and armor, such as the poisonous silverthorn or fiery naphtha.

Player characters must carry and eat rations every day or their health starts dropping. Rations are sold in taverns and can be found on enemies and in caches. Rations can also be poisoned or spoiled and will sicken characters if they eat it, adversely affecting their health, although careful inspection of all packages of questionable provenance will avoid this possibility.

=== Combat ===
A battle scene. Gorath, marked with a green square on the grid, is having his turn; hovering mouse over the target marks it with a yellow square, and shows attack damage estimate on the bottom of the screen.

Combat is turn-based and takes place on a grid, similar to tactical role-playing games. The characters can move to a different location on the grid and if they can reach an enemy, can attack in the same move. There are two options for attacking: a thrust and a swing. The thrust is the default attack used when moving to attack an enemy. The swing often does more damage but is less accurate and uses up one point of health/stamina. Fighters can use crossbows and magicians can cast spells, but only if there are no enemy units in adjacent squares. The player can also rest, which regains health and stamina, defend against enemy mêlée attacks, or assess an enemy's capabilities.

Injured enemies may try to flee from combat, and will escape entirely and permanently from the player's grasp, unless they are killed or otherwise prevented them from reaching the upper edge of the battlefield. Defeated enemies remain on the ground after a battle, allowing the player to loot their remains. Salvaged items of little use to the party may be sold at shops in order to boost cash reserves.

The combat interface is also used to solve magical traps. Traps involve various types of hazards, such as fireball blasters and laser crystals, and the player either has to disable them using the objects provided or otherwise navigate through the trap and reach the top of the combat field.

Although the game uses a GUI, many actions can be performed using keys as well. There is a glitch (or intended hidden feature) that allows the player to make certain combinations of two moves in a single turn—one using the mouse and another using the keyboard—or rest twice by pressing 'R' before the turn begins and holding it through the turn. Computer opponents also seem to use this in some instances (like moving and defending in the same turn).

Another type of character-environment interaction, that could be considered a trap or a bonus, are the graveyards scattered around the landscape. The player is able to read the inscriptions on the gravestones (usually in the form of a short poetic eulogy), and then decide to dig up the grave (if someone has a shovel). Some graves reveal items and/or money, while others summon a ghost (in some cases, multiple ghosts), which must be fought using the standard combat interface.

=== Temples, stores and inns ===
Temples offer a variety of services including healing and blessing equipment. They also sell a relatively expensive teleportation service; the player is able to teleport between any temples they have already visited, with the price based on the distance traveled. This operates on the principle that a person visiting a new temple will memorize a unique pattern upon the wall, and by recalling this pattern at a different temple, be transported to the first temple with the aid of a priest.

Stores buy and sell various kinds of items; some also repair equipment. Inns and taverns allow characters to buy food and alcohol, gain information on local happenings, gamble (in some inns), talk to some NPCs, earn money by playing the lute, and sleep, which allows full healing of wounds and fatigue, whereas resting in the wilderness only restores 80% of health and stamina.

== Characters ==
=== Main characters ===
Seigneur Locklear
(Chapters 1, 5, 7) Locklear is the youngest son of the Baron of Land's End, a Seigneur in Prince Arutha's court, and a skilled swordsman decorated for his service at Armengar and Sethanon during the Great Uprising (A Darkness at Sethanon). Locklear recently entered the service of a Kingdom garrison in Yabon to investigate reports of moredhel activity, where he rescued Gorath of the Ardanien from an assassin.

Squire Owyn Beleforte
(Chapters 1, 2, 3, 4, 6, 8, 9) Owyn is a nineteen-year-old magician and the youngest son of the Count of Tiburn. Uninterested in politics, Owyn instead idolizes the magician Pug. A resourceful and crafty boy, Owyn used part of his father's wealth to travel and study magic in secret. His father eventually discovered what he was doing and, due to the political embarrassment Owyn causes him, has given him a great deal of freedom, hoping that he will eventually settle down and become suitable for a political marriage. Owyn was traveling home from visiting his aunt in Yabon when he met Locklear and Gorath. Not eager to return to the boredom of life at home, Owyn hitches his fate to theirs.

Gorath of the Ardanien
(Chapters 1, 2, 3, 4, 6, 8, 9) A hero of the Riftwar, Gorath was chieftain of Clan Ardanien and Delekhan's chief rival to the throne of Sar-Sargoth. Gorath believes Delekhan's plan to invade the Kingdom to be madness and betrays the moredhel to warn Prince Arutha, as it the only way to save his people from another disastrous war. There is also another reason for his exile: he has broken from the Dark Path and is "Returning" to the eledhel in Elvandar, assuming he is not killed by his brethren first.

Seigneur James
(Chapters 2, 3, 5, 7) Once known as Jimmy the Hand, James is a legend among the Mockers and the son of the Upright Man, though he is unaware of his parentage. After foiling a Nighthawk attempt to assassinate Prince Arutha (Silverthorn), James was forced to give up his life as a thief and became a squire in Arutha's court, where he became best friends with Locklear. James eventually rose to the rank of Seigneur, becoming one of Arutha's most trusted and loyal servants but still wanders the Thieves' Highway, often on business for the Crown.

Patrus
(Chapters 5, 7) Patrus is the court magician and magical adviser to Baron Gabot in Northwarden and one of Owyn's early magical tutors. Despite his old age, he is a spry and capable magician, whose knowledge of the Union spell allows him to temporarily read moredhel.

Duke Pug conDoin
(Chapters 8, 9) As an orphan growing up in Crydee, Pug was apprenticed to Kulgan the magician but showed little magical ability until he was captured by the Tsurani during the Riftwar (Magician: Apprentice). Seeing potential in the boy, Tsurani Great Ones trained him in the magic of the Greater Path, previously nonexistent in Midkemia. When he returned, Pug helped the sorcerer Macros the Black end the Riftwar and was adopted into the royal family and given land to start his academy of magic at Stardock (Magician: Master). Pug is considered the most powerful magician in Midkemia, having inherited much of Macros' power in addition to his Tsurani training. He is married to Katala, whom he met in Kelewan, and has two children: a biological son William and an adopted daughter Gamina, who has telepathic powers.

=== Allies ===
Prince Arutha conDoin
Prince Arutha of Krondor is ruler of the Western Realm, younger brother of King Lyam, and half-brother of Duke Martin of Crydee. Arutha proved himself one of the Kingdom's best field commanders defending Crydee during the Riftwar and became prince after the unexpected deaths of King Rodric, Prince Erland, and his father Duke Borric. He is a well-loved and capable ruler, albeit a reluctant one.

Cullich
Gorath's estranged wife Cullich is a moredhel witch who helped him escape from the Northlands. Cullich thinks Gorath's willingness to surrender his position as clan leader is a sign of weakness but she doesn't trust Delekhan and will help Gorath if she can.

Baron Gabot
Baron Gabot is commander of Northwarden, which guards one of the four passes between the Kingdom and the Northlands. Previously Huntmaster of Carse, Gabot was old acquaintances with Duke Martin, who recommended him to the position after Baron Rossol died. Like Martin's father Duke Borric, Gabot saw the benefit of having a magician in his service and appointed Patrus his magical adviser.

Liallan
As a powerful moredhel clan leader and Delekhan's consort, Liallan openly supports him though she believes his plan is doomed to fail. She has her eye on the throne of Sar-Sargoth for herself and secretly aids many of Delekhan's enemies, including engineering Gorath's escape from the Northlands. Should Delekhan and his son Moraeulf die during their invasion, it would leave her in a prime position to take over the leadership of the moredhel.

Duke Martin conDoin
Once known as Martin Longbow, Duke Martin of Crydee is the elder half-brother of King Lyam and Prince Arutha. The illegitimate son of Duke Borric, he was raised and trained by the elves in Elvandar before becoming Huntmaster and later Duke upon the death of his father. One of the best archers in Midkemia, Martin dislikes court life and often roams the forests with his longbow in hand.

The Oracle of Aal
The Aal are among the oldest races in the universe and one of the few to survive the Chaos Wars between the Valheru and the gods. The Oracle, the last of its dying race, agreed to help Pug and Tomas during the Great Rising in exchange for salvation. After the battle of Sethanon, Pug brought the Oracle to Sethanon and placed it in the body of the dragon Ryath, whose mind was drained by a Dreadlord (A Darkness at Sethanon). The Oracle of Aal now watches over the Lifestone and will send warning to Pug and a secret garrison near Sethanon if it is disturbed.

Squire Phillip
Though he appears to be a young noble about Owyn's age, Phillip is actually thirty-seven, a captain in the Kingdom Army, and a courier for the secret garrison near Sethanon. Owyn met him at a party in Yabon prior to the start of the game and meets him again throughout his travels.

Tomas
Prince Consort to Queen Aglaranna and Warleader of Elvandar, Tomas grew up in Crydee with his best friend Pug. During the Riftwar, Tomas discovered the dying dragon Rhuagh, who gave him an ancient suit of armor (Magician: Apprentice). The armor transformed Tomas into a blend of human and Valheru and gave him the memories and abilities of Ashen-Shugar, the Valheru to whom it once belonged. After marrying Aglaranna, Tomas considers Elvandar under his protection and only leaves in the most extreme of circumstances.

=== Villains ===
Delekhan
Delekhan is the leader of the Moredhel Nations of the North. One of the Murmandamus' field generals during the Great Rising (A Darkness at Sethanon), Delekhan believes Murmandamus still lives, imprisoned by Prince Arutha at Sethanon. He has unified his people with the help of magicians known only as "the Six" (later revealed to be Tsurani Great Ones) in order to invade the Kingdom of the Isles, free Murmandamus, and finish what was started a decade before.

Makala
Makala is a Great One, a magician from the Tsurani homeworld of Kelewan, who is visiting Prince Arutha's court ostensibly as a representative of the Emperor of Tsuranuanni. Believing that Pug hid a weapon of tremendous power which could be used against the Tsurani, Makala set out to investigate what really happened at the battle of Sethanon. He manipulates Delekhan and the moredhel, using their attack as a diversion so that he can enter Sethanon unhindered.

Narab and Nago
The brothers Narab and Nago are magicians who serve Delekhan. Nago has infiltrated the Kingdom and coordinates moredhel spies from a secret location near Sarth. Narab has fallen out of favor with Delekhan, and seeking to regain his position in Delekhan's inner circle, captures Owyn and Gorath for him. However, Delekhan is displeased with what he has done so Narab turns on his former master and helps Owyn and Gorath escape. He then plans on becoming leader of the moredhel himself.

Navon du Sandau
To most he is simply a charismatic young merchant, but Navon is actually Neville Corvalis, the half-brother of Owyn's cousin Ugyne. When Ugyne's father Count Corvalis found out that Neville was his wife's illegitimate son, he arranged to have Neville killed in a wine cellar collapse. Though he was believed dead, Neville's body was never found. He was found by Nighthawks who had regrouped in Cavall after their destruction in Krondor by Prince Arutha (A Darkness at Sethanon). Using a Corvalis family heirloom, a magical spyglass, Neville convinced them he had magical powers and became their leader. He then set about exacting revenge on Count Corvalis, burning down the keep so the caverns underneath could be used as a Nighthawk hideout and courting Ugyne so he could take over her family's fortune.

== Locations ==
=== Midkemia ===
Cavall Keep
(Accessible in Chapters 1, 2, 3, 6) Cavall Keep is a small eastern farming town in the Kenting Hills ruled by Owyn's uncle, Count Geoffrey Corvalis. The keep burned down mysteriously three years ago, preventing access to the caverns underneath, which run south to the waterfall known as Cavall Run.

Elvandar
(Accessible in Chapter 6) The forest city of Elvandar, home of the eledhel (the light elves), lies far to the northwest of the duchy of Yabon and is ruled by Queen Aglaranna and Prince Consort Tomas. Though isolated and well-protected, the Tsurani attacked Elvandar during the Riftwar and there are still skirmishes with the moredhel on its northern borders.

Highcastle
(Accessible in Chapters 1, 2, 3) The frontier fort town of Highcastle guards Cutter's Gap, one of the four passes between the Kingdom and the Northlands. Overrun by the moredhel during the Great Rising (A Darkness at Sethanon), Prince Arutha had the fortifications reinforced in recent years. Highcastle is currently commanded by Baron Baldwin de la Troville and, in his absence, Baron Kevin of Zun.

Krondor
(Accessible in Chapters 1, 2, 3, 6) Capital of the Western Realm of the Kingdom of the Isles, Krondor is the traditional home of the heir apparent to the throne. It is currently ruled by Prince Arutha and Princess Anita, though the sewers under the city are a maze of tunnels known as the Thieves' Highway and controlled by the Mockers, the thieves' guild of Krondor, and their mysterious leader, the Upright Man.

LaMut
(Accessible in Chapters 1, 2, 3, 6) The city of LaMut is located in the duchy of Yabon, near the reopened rift to Kelewan. It is ruled by the Earl Kasumi and home to a large Tsurani population that settled there after the Riftwar.

The in-game map of Midkemia

Malac's Cross
(Accessible in Chapters 1, 2, 3, 6) The city of Malac's Cross marks the eastern boundary of the Western Realm and is home to the Abbaye Ishap, an ancient temple currently run by the Abbot Graves. Outside of the city, where the old city once stood, is a statue of a dragon, built as a tribute to Malac, from which the Oracle of Aal can be contacted.

Northwarden
(Accessible in Chapters 1, 2, 3, 5) The fortress of Northwarden lies on a narrow mountain path overlooking one of the four passes between the Kingdom and the Northlands. Northwarden is currently commanded by Baron Gabot.

Romney
(Accessible in Chapters 1, 2, 3, 6) Located on the river Rom, the eastern city of Romney is known as the City of Guilds. Although ruled by Duke Romney, control of the city lies with its various merchant guilds, leading to the occasional guild war.

Sarth
(Accessible in Chapters 1, 2, 3, 6) The town of Sarth is home to an ancient mountaintop fortress which was converted into an abbey and library by the Order of Ishap. The vaults have hundreds of thousands of books, containing a wealth of knowledge about the history and lore of Midkemia, tended to by Brother Anthony and Brother Marc. Beneath the vaults is an abandoned dwarven emerald mine known as the Mac Bourgalan Dok.

Sar-Isbandia (Armengar)
(Accessible in Chapter 4) The fortress city of Sar-Isbandia was built atop miles of naphtha tunnels long ago by the glamredhel (the mad elves) before they were obliterated by the moredhel (the dark elves). Located in the Vale of Isbandia north of the Inclindel Gap, humans from Yabon settled in the city hundreds of years ago, renamed it Armengar and became lifelong enemies of the moredhel. The Armengarians were among Murmandamus' first targets during the Great Rising so Prince Arutha and Guy du Bas-Tyra, the city's Protector, evacuated the city and attempted to destroy Murmandamus' army by incinerating the city (A Darkness at Sethanon). Recently, moredhel have moved into the ruins and started to rebuild.

Sar-Sargoth
(Accessible in Chapter 4) Twin city of Sar-Isbandia, the fortress city of Sar-Sargoth to the north was also built by the glamredhel and was taken by the moredhel as their capital. The tunnels beneath the city are home to Delekhan's dungeons while the outskirts are lined with pikes bearing the heads of his enemies.

Sethanon
(Surface ruins accessible in Chapters 1, 2, 3, 6, underground ruins only accessible in Chapter 9) Once a minor barony in the heart of the Kingdom, Sethanon was poorly defended and completely destroyed during the Great Rising (A Darkness at Sethanon). Coincidentally built above the ancient Valheru ruins containing the Lifestone, King Lyam and Prince Arutha ordered the city abandoned after the Battle of Sethanon, ostensibly as a memorial to those who had died there, and stationed a secret garrison nearby to protect it. Within the ruins beneath the city lies the Lifestone and its guardian, the dragon Ryath, whose mind contains the Oracle of Aal.

Silden
(Accessible in Chapters 1, 2, 3, 6) The eastern fishing town of Silden is a seaport on the Kingdom Sea. Located on a nearby island off the coast is the temple of Eortis, the dead god of the sea. Known for its shady underworld, someone known only as The Crawler has recently establish himself within the city, disrupting business for both the Mockers in Krondor and the guilds in Romney.

=== Timirianya ===
(Accessible in Chapter 8) The desolate world of Timirianya was destroyed by the Valheru and is currently inhabited by Panath-Tiandn, humanoid serpents akin to Pantathians. During the Chaos Wars, the gods of Timirianya crystallized magic into solid manna, causing the Valheru to leave when they thought the world's energy was depleted. In order to cast magic on Timirianya, one must use a crystal staff and keep it charged with raw manna.

The Temple of Karzeen Mauk
Located in the north, all that remains of the high temple of the gods of Timirianya are nine pillars, within which the surviving gods have taken refuge. Only Dhatsavan, Lord of Gates, still has enough power left to communicate with visitors.

The Temple of Dhatsavan (Riftworld Mine)
Also known as the Riftworld Mine, the ruins of the temple are buried underground and are currently occupied by Panath-Tiandn. After Makala abducts her, Gamina is imprisoned in a crystal cage within the ruins.

== Plot ==
Ten years after A Darkness at Sethanon, Seigneur Locklear is serving at a northern Kingdom garrison when he saves Gorath of the Ardanien from an assassin. Gorath has brought a warning of an invasion planned by Delekhan, leader of the moredhel, so Locklear agrees to take him to see Prince Arutha in Krondor. Injured from numerous attacks, they ask for help from Owyn Beleforte, a young magician from Tiburn. The game begins in their camp north of LaMut.

=== Chapter I: Into A Dark Night ===
Owyn is bandaging Gorath's and Locklear's injuries when they are attacked by a moredhel assassin whom Gorath dispatches before the three of them set out south. Surviving multiple assassination attempts, they eventually reach Krondor. Finding the palace gates sabotaged, they enter the palace via the sewers with Seigneur James' help. Upon meeting Prince Arutha, another moredhel assassin sneaks in and attempts to kill Gorath, only to be foiled by Pug.

=== Chapter II: Shadow Of The Nighthawks ===
Gorath informs Arutha of Delekhan's plans, but Arutha does not trust him because he does not know the location of the attack. Gorath thinks they can find out by intercepting Delekhan's Nighthawk spies in Romney. Arutha arranges for James to escort Gorath to Romney and meet with a group of the king's soldiers investigating recent Nighthawk activity in the east. Arutha will muster his army and await word of where the attack will occur. James, Owyn, and Gorath secretly slip out of the city through the sewers and head east. Arriving at the tavern in Romney, they discover that the king's soldiers have all been murdered.

=== Chapter III: The Spyglass And The Spider ===
Two clues were left behind at the murder scene: an enchanted spyglass and a silver spider. James, Owyn, and Gorath follow the trail of the spyglass and the spider north to Cavall Keep and uncover the leader of the Nighthawks, the merchant Navon du Sandau. After killing him, they enter the Nighthawks' hideout in the caverns beneath Cavall Keep, where they learn that Delekhan plans to attack Northwarden. Realizing that Nighthawks probably infiltrated the fortress, they split up. James heads to Northwarden while Owyn and Gorath head south to warn Arutha. Before they can reach Arutha though, Owyn and Gorath are captured by Narab, one of Delekhan's chieftains.

=== Chapter IV: Marked For Death ===
Gorath and Owyn are taken to Sar-Sargoth, where Narab presents them to Delekhan. Delekhan, enraged that Narab has ruined his plans, tells him his life is forfeit. Narab turns on Delekhan and, unbeknownst to them, frees Owyn and Gorath. They escape Sar-Sargoth and head south to the Inclindel Gap, where they meet a Kingdom patrol and are taken to Arutha's camp. Learning of the impending attack on Northwarden, Arutha readies his army and sends Owyn and Gorath to Krondor to seek Pug's help in case the moredhel employ magic.

=== Chapter V: When Rivers Run Blood ===
James and Locklear arrive at Northwarden and are sent by Baron Gabot to find his magical adviser Patrus. The three of them help Duke Martin prepare for the attack by poisoning moredhel food supplies, finding the minstrel Tamney, stealing the moredhel battle plans, and killing six moredhel magicians hiding behind Kingdom lines. Returning to Northwarden as the moredhel siege begins, they discover that Nighthawks have murdered Baron Gabot, leaving James in command. The battle goes badly and they are about to be overrun when Arutha arrives with his army in time to drive off the moredhel.

=== Chapter VI: Betrayal ===
Makala visits Pug in Krondor, telling him that Gamina is considered an abomination by the Assembly of Magicians and that he has imprisoned her until her fate can be decided. Pug is enraged at Makala's betrayal and vows to find her, blasting the words "The Book Of Macros" into the wall. When Katala is unable to find him or their daughter, she discovers his message and informs Owyn and Gorath. Following clues from the libraries at Sarth and the Abbaye Ishap, Owyn and Gorath head west to Elvandar, where Gorath completes his "Returning" and pledges his allegiance to Queen Aglaranna and Prince Consort Tomas. Tomas shows them the Book of Macros, a gift from Pug to find him should he leave the message to do so. Recently injured by a poisoned blade in a moredhel skirmish, Tomas asks Owyn and Gorath to go in his stead. Owyn and Gorath read the book, which teleports them into the unknown.

=== Chapter VII: The Long Ride ===
In Northwarden, the moredhel raiding leader is captured and reveals that they plan to use a rift machine in the Dimwood to bypass Arutha's army, enter Sethanon, and free Murmandamus, whom they believe is alive and imprisoned there. Realizing that the attack was a diversion engineered by Makala, Arutha orders his troops to Sethanon and instructs James, Locklear, and Patrus to find and destroy the rift machine. After learning that the machine can be disrupted by a Tsurani device called a Waani, they find the machine and disable it. However, as the rift collapses, it pulls in everything nearby before exploding. James and Locklear grab onto trees but Patrus is sucked into the collapsing rift and is apparently killed. At the same moment, three figures appear in a flash of purple light.

=== Chapter VIII: Of Lands Afar ===
Owyn and Gorath are teleported to Timirianya, where Owyn realizes that magic does not work and Pug would be powerless. Owyn and Gorath eventually find Pug, who has figured out that by abducting Gamina and manipulating Delekhan, Makala has lured Pug away from Midkemia and Arutha's army away from Sethanon and is free to enter Sethanon unopposed and seek out the Lifestone. Using the Cup of Rlnn Skrr, Owyn restores Pug's powers and they find Gamina imprisoned in a crystal cage in the underground ruins of the Temple of Dhatsavan. Gorath smashes the cage and, using a special pattern stone Pug has brought, the four of them return to Midkemia.

=== Chapter IX: Mad Gods Rage ===
In a flash of purple light, Pug, Owyn, and Gorath appear before James and Locklear in the Dimwood and tell them to wait for Arutha and let him know that there is no magical threat to his army; Makala will be waiting for Pug at Sethanon. Pug, Owyn, and Gorath travel to the caverns beneath Sethanon and kill the Tsurani Great Ones ("the Six") protecting the Lifestone Chamber. Gorath remains behind to protect the Oracle of Aal, which was incapacitated by Makala, while Pug and Owyn confront the magician. Makala believes that Pug was keeping the Lifestone hidden to use as a weapon and wants it destroyed, but Pug refuses because it would release the Valheru souls trapped inside. Engaging Makala in a magical battle, Pug and Owyn eventually kill him.

Afterward, Gorath enters the chamber locked in combat with Delekhan. When Delekhan reaches for the Lifestone, Gorath tries to stop him and they begin to transform as the Valheru within try to escape. Pug and Owyn are forced to kill them both with a blast of magic in order to prevent the Valheru from being released. Returning above ground, Pug creates magical illusions of Murmandamus and Delekhan which are then incinerated by the Oracle of Aal. Having seen their leaders killed, the moredhel retreat, during which Narab kills Delekhan's son Moraeulf, fulfilling his plans for taking over the moredhel. Owyn is left alone with Pug, who reveals that since Owyn now knows about the Lifestone, Pug must ensure that the secret is safe and suggests that Owyn become one of his students at Stardock. Owyn laughs and replies that he's never wanted anything else.

== Development ==
Although the game was licensed from Raymond E. Feist, a long-held myth was that the text and the story of the game were actually created by Feist himself. Feist states in his afterword to Krondor: The Betrayal that he was busy writing The King's Buccaneer during the game's production and that the plot, text, and new characters were created solely by designers Neal Hallford and John Cutter. Feist did have editorial final say on the game, but most of what Hallford and Cutter created was left intact.

=== Technical details ===
The game runs in 256-color 320x200 VGA mode. The graphics engine uses textured 3D graphics to draw the terrain and uses sprites for most of the detailed objects. The engine does not support multilevel terrain as such, but obstacles such as hills and mountains are supported. Most shops, inns, temples, special locations, and large cities are navigated through pictures usable through hotspots, while smaller towns have 3D buildings.

NPC and character art is based on photographs. Environments are a mix of captured images and hand-drawn. In combat and puzzle screens, all characters are animated, except for movement - characters do not appear to move their legs while walking. The game models illuminate to a certain extent: in the overworld, day and night are modeled, and in underground locations, the player needs to use a torch or a light spell to illuminate their surroundings.

The game runs in protected mode, using Borland C++'s Ergo DPMI / RTM DOS extender. It remained quite compatible with Microsoft Windows up to the 9x series and works very well in DOSBox and VDMSound. A playable version for Mac OS X DOSBox is also available.

=== Release history ===
The following commercial editions of the game have been released:

- 1993: The original 3½" floppy disk release.
- 1994: CD-ROM edition, which includes Red Book CD-audio versions of the original game's MIDI music tracks, a 5-minute video interview with Raymond E. Feist, and a Windows hint program/package.
- 1996: Re-release of the CD-ROM in Sierra's SierraOriginals budget line.
- 1997: free download on Sierra's website to promote the game Betrayal in Antara, though this version is no longer available.
- 1998: CD-ROM edition (but without the CD-audio soundtrack) that came with the hardcover edition of Krondor: the Betrayal, with a PDF manual and video interview with Feist, promotional materials and a trailer for Return to Krondor.
- 2010: CD-ROM edition re-released on GOG.com as a downloadable file.

Contrary to popular belief, Vivendi Universal Games has stated that the game is not free to be redistributed by others.

=== Krondor: The Betrayal ===
Feist later wrote Krondor: The Betrayal, a novelization of the game and the first in a series of new Midkemia books called The Riftwar Legacy. Feist credited Hallford and Cutter as co-authors of the original story for Krondor: the Betrayal, and dedicated the book to both of them.

The game and book are set approximately halfway between A Darkness at Sethanon and Prince of the Blood. There are minor differences, such as Owyn's last name being Belefote rather than Beleforte and the towns of Tanneurs and Eggley are changed to Tannerus and Eggly, but the novel largely covers the main plot of the game accurately and ignores most of the sidequests.

The game first introduced Lysle Rigger, Jimmy the Hand's long lost twin brother as well as Kat and Abbot Graves, whose granddaughter was Katherine "Kitty" Graves. Both Lysle Rigger and Kitty Graves would play significant roles in Feist's Serpentwar novels.

== Reception ==
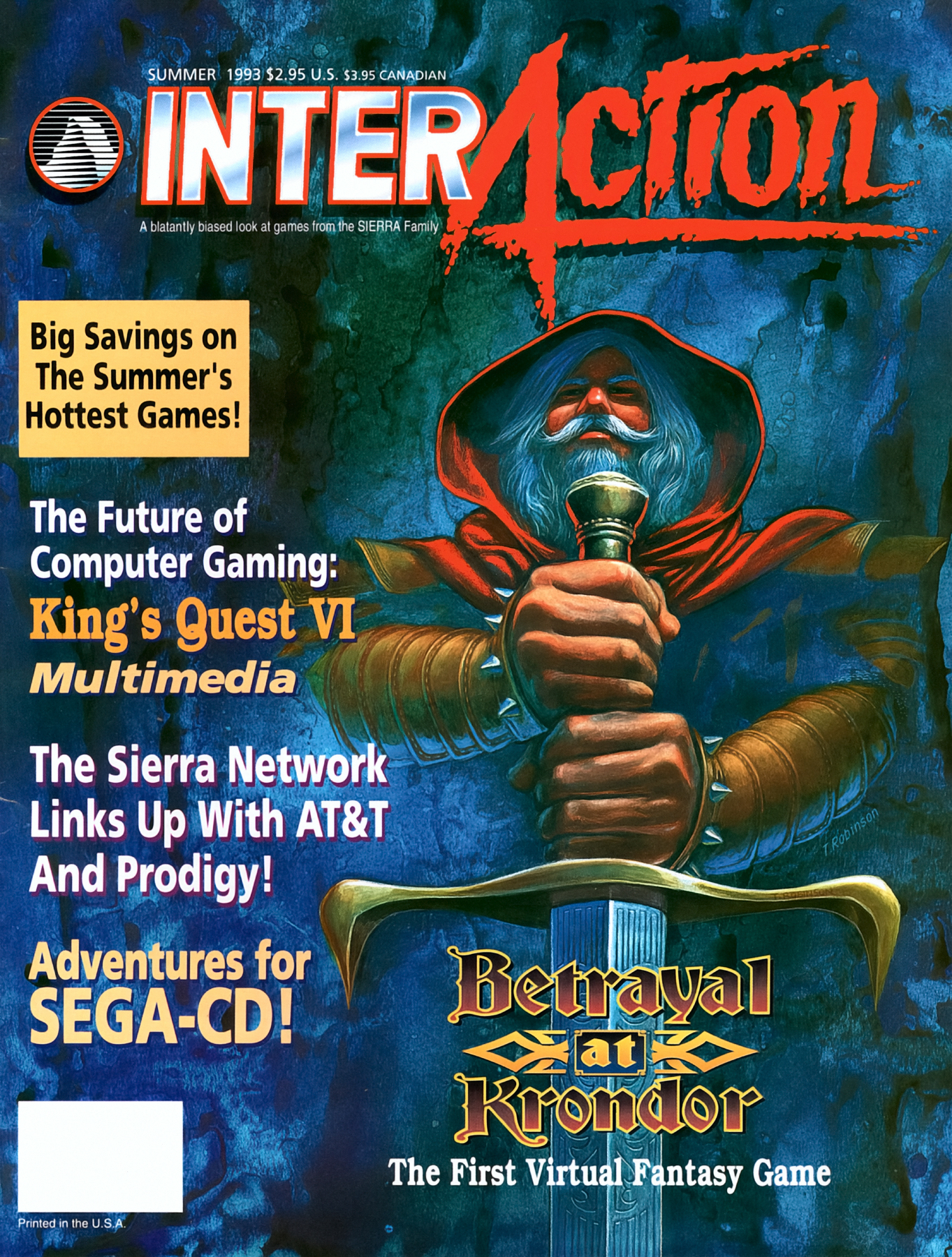
Betrayal at Krondor featured on the cover of the Summer 1993 edition of Interaction Magazine.

Sales of the original 3½" floppy disk release were slow, leading Sierra to sell the Riftwar rights back to Raymond Feist, but the game became a hit when it was re-released on CD-ROM.

Jim Trunzo reviewed Betrayal at Krondor in White Wolf #38 (1993), giving it a final evaluation of "Excellent" and stated that "Betrayal at Krondor employs one of the easiest and most intuitive interfaces encountered, one that conveniently handles all aspects of the game, from trading to casting magic spells to combat. Graphics and sound are top-notch, character development is logical and fair, combat is beautifully animated, and I have yet to find anything about the game that I don't like. There simply isn't any facet of the game that isn't outstanding."

Pelit gave Betrayal at Krondor a 94% score, calling the game citing "the wonderful game system, lack of bugs, and the book-like atmosphere" and said "Krondor is as big a revolution in turn-based role-playing games as the Underworlds were in 3D role-playing games." Computer Gaming World in October 1993 called Krondor "a fantasy role-playing game unlike any other ... a new high-watermark in RPG design". While noting that the graphics "are not going to knock players out of their chairs", the magazine praised combat as "the best I've seen in a fantasy CRPG". It concluded that the game was "a rare gem ... and has set new standards for others to follow. For once, a game actually lives up to, even exceeds, its advance billing". A less enthusiastic review by Sandy Petersen appeared in November 1993 in Dragon magazine #199 in the "Eye of the Monitor" column, in which he gave the game two stars out of five. Though Petersen praised the graphics for being "well-rendered" at times and for its "rather entertaining plot", he chastised the gameplay for being slow and for subjecting the player to "dull maintenance activities", such as armor polishing, as well as quests that he found frustratingly hard to understand how to complete. Quandary gave it a 4.5/5 in its 1996 review, calling it "no ordinary role-playing game" with its "complex" immersive environment, traps, and riddles replacing "the usual pits and levers and rolling rocks that are more common in role-playing dungeons." They also called the strategic turn-based combat "very satisfying" though "it takes a little getting used to."

Compute! in December 1993 said that Krondor "towers above the genre", approving of its nonlinear design, graphics, and combat. While criticizing the "glued-on beards and plastic elf ears" of character portraits, and warning of the complexity of Feist's worldbuilding, the magazine concluded that the game "approaches a new level of realism and enjoyment".

Betrayal at Krondor was named 1993's best role-playing game and overall "Game of the Year" by Computer Games Strategy Plus. In June 1994 Betrayal at Krondor won Computer Gaming World's Role-Playing Game of the Year award. The editors wrote that it "is the quintessential example of how a computer game should be built from a fantasy novel", stating that they thought it took the most creative risks while readers liked "its play value and non-linear story". The magazine ranked Krondor #43 on their list of the 150 best games of all time in the magazine's November 1996 Anniversary Edition. The magazine added the game to its Hall of Fame in 2001, saying that Krondor was the "first role-playing game to offer a 3D environment and...one of the first games to use digitized images effectively in the context of a role-playing game." In 1994, PC Gamer US named Betrayal at Krondor as the 31st best computer game ever. The editors hailed it as "a pivotal title in the evolution of role-playing games", praising its "interactive plot and characters that stir the emotions of the player." The magazine later included it on its 1997 "The Best 50 Games of All-Time" list. In 1998, PC Gamer US declared it the 44th-best computer game ever released, and the editors called it "a classic that will last through the ages."

== See also ==
Release timeline
1993	Betrayal at Krondor
1994
1995
1996
1997	Betrayal in Antara
1998	Return to Krondor

- Betrayal in Antara, a spiritual successor developed by Sierra, using the same engine
- Return to Krondor, the direct sequel
