= Krondor: Tear of the Gods =

Novel by Raymond E. Feist

- First UK edition
- Author: Raymond E. Feist
- Cover artist: Geoff Taylor
- Language: English
- Series: Riftwar Legacy
- Genre: Fantasy
- Publisher: HarperCollins
- Publication date: November 20, 2000
- Publication place: United States
- Media type: Print (Hardback & Paperback)
- Pages: 368 (first edition)
- ISBN: 0-00-224680-5
- OCLC: 48153232
- Preceded by: Krondor: The Assassins

Krondor: Tear of the Gods is a fantasy novel by American author Raymond E. Feist, the third book in his The Riftwar Legacy series. It is a novelization of the computer game Return to Krondor.

== Plot ==
The story opens with a closer look at the person behind the plots to force the Kingdom of the Isles into war with its neighbors. The sorcerer Sidi uses a pirate named Bear to create chaos in the Kingdom.

Squire James of Krondor is sent by Arutha, Prince of Krondor, to escort the newly appointed court magician, Jazhara, to the palace. In doing so, they discover a silk maker using child labor to make profits. Jazhara discovers that the trader is actually a spy for her great-uncle, Hazara-Kahn, Ambassador of the Empire of Great Kesh. James and Jazhara proceed to kill the spy and his guards, and to free the children. After searching the shop, they discover that the spy was a double agent, working for the crime lord The Crawler.

After the new court magician, Jazhara is introduced to the Prince, Arutha, James is tasked with taking Jazhara on a tour of Krondor. Jazhara has, in the past, had a love affair with young William (the son of Duke Pug, the master magician). She is eager to speak to William about their affair. James leads Jazhara to the Rainbow Parrot Inn, where they are greeted with a scene of carnage. Upon entering the scene is a massacre. William is alive and confronted by 3 armed men. Squire James and Jazhara immediately go to William's aid and the men are soon dispatched. William's new sweetheart is lying close to death and they discover that the man "Bear" is behind the attack. Talia soon dies, with William vowing to avenge her death.

Soon after, there is a loud rocking explosion and the three investigate and finds the prison in chaos, as apparently Bear broke into the prison to reach a person with a specific knowledge that Bear's master needed. Having tortured the information out of the prisoner, Bear escapes, but not before killing the man.

Soon after, a high priest of the Temple of Ishap sheds light on some recent events: that the Temple had been transporting a divine artifact by ship, when it was raided and sunk, the artifact included. The artifact, called the Tear of the Gods, allows the priests of various temples to channel the divine will of the gods, without which, humanity would be cut off from the gods. William, Jazhara, and James are tasked by Prince Arutha to retrieve the artifact. Joined by a representative of the temple, a warrior priest, they recruit a member of a magicians' guild to raise the sunken ship.

Having successfully retrieved the artifact, they are beset by Bear, who proves to be immune to nearly any attack. Talia's final gift to William then manifests; as Talia was an acolyte of Kahooli, the God of Retribution, her final gift turns William into an avatar of the deity for a short time, and he defeats Bear.

== Reception ==
Kirkus hail the novel as "...perfect for series fans." While Publishers Weekly commented that the author will "bring out the gaming crowd."
