= Return to Krondor =

1998 video game

- Developers: PyroTechnix; 7th Level
- Publisher: Sierra Studios
- Designers: Andy Ashcraft; Jeryd Pojawa
- Programmers: Chuck Wiggins; John Schnurrenberger
- Artists: Thomas Miller; Jeff Mills; Michael Brown
- Writers: Neal Hallford; Joshua Culp; William Maxwell
- Composer: Chuck Mitchell
- Series: Riftwar
- Engine: True3D
- Platform: Windows
- Release: NA: November 24, 1998; EU: 1998
- Genre: Role-playing
- Mode: Single player

Return to Krondor is a role-playing video game set in Raymond Feist's fictional fantasy setting of Midkemia. A sequel to 1993's Betrayal at Krondor, it was released for Windows on the PC in time for the 1998 Thanksgiving and Christmas season. Within the game, the player commands a group of heroes with different attributes, strengths, and weaknesses which the player may upgrade over the course of the game.

Feist later wrote a novelization of this game, entitled Krondor: Tear of the Gods. It is the third part of his Riftwar Legacy trilogy; the first part of which was a novelization of Betrayal at Krondor entitled Krondor: The Betrayal.

== Gameplay ==
Starting in the city of Krondor and eventually venturing out into other specific parts of the Midkemia world, the game focuses on battling humans and evil creatures of various kinds. Although the story is very linear in nature, the game offers a range of possibilities while the player is adventuring in Krondor. While the computer graphics of the game is now visually outdated by games like the plotwise very similar Baldur's Gate: Dark Alliance II, the game featured some unique or rarely seen features at the time of release, including elaborate alchemy and thieving. Using alchemical equipment, it is possible to brew custom potions from a variety of ingredients. In order to open locked or trapped chests and doors, a simulation of the process of disarming and lockpicking is initiated. Facing a variety of different mechanisms, it is necessary to pick the right lockpicking tools and then use them with care, simulated by carefully timed mouse clicking.

== Characters ==
- James is the player character in the game. He is a thief who has become a squire by favor of Arutha, Prince of Krondor.
- Jazhara is a mage from a distant, Middle-Eastern-inspired land called Kesh.
- William is a Krondorian guard and exceptional fighter.
- Kendaric is both a mage and an alchemist.
- Solon is a priest using divine magic and a body that blocks all blows.

== Development ==
In 1994 Dynamix, at this time a division of Sierra On-line, reorganized their staff and canceled a planned sequel to Betrayal at Krondor named Thief of Dreams. Computer Gaming World reported in April 1994:

As it presently stands, Dynamix has no intentions of doing a sequel to Betrayal at Krondor, although the company has the option to do a sequel should they begin work prior to 1995. A significant amount of design work had already been completed on the sequel, but Dynamix elected to terminate both the project and the project's guiding force on the computer side, John Cutter. Cutter and his design talents are currently looking for [a] home.

Fans organized a letter/e-mail campaign to persuade Dynamix to reverse their decision, to no avail.

7th Level purchased the license for the game in 1995 and renamed it Return to Krondor. Shortly after, Sierra began work on an unlicensed sequel to Betrayal at Krondor called Betrayal in Antara, setting the two games up to be in direct competition. This is why Return to Krondor was billed as "The official sequel to the best selling RPG" [emphasis added].

Designer Andy Ashcraft stated, "Dynamix was a flight sim company, and their engine [for Betrayal at Krondor] was a flight sim engine that had been tweaked into an RPG. Our strength is in animation, so we're tweaking an animation engine into an RPG." 7th Level developed the game basics, produced the screen backgrounds and added the character voices. They then turned to Cincinnati-based Pyrotechnix for the more technical aspects of the game development. Pyrotechnix was sold to Sierra On-line on December 8, 1997. In 1998 Pyrotechnix completed the game. It was published in November.

The game was updated for compatibility with modern Windows systems and re-released on GOG.com on March 4, 2010.

== Reception ==
Reception

Aggregate score
Aggregator	Score
GameRankings	72%

Review scores
Publication	Score
AllGame	3/5
CNET Gamecenter	8/10
Computer Games Strategy Plus	4/5
Computer Gaming World	2.5/5
Game Informer	8.25/10
GamePro	4/5
GameRevolution	B+
GameSpot	7.9/10
IGN	7.4/10
Next Generation	3/5
PC Accelerator	5/10
PC Gamer (US)	80%

The game received above-average reviews according to the review aggregation website GameRankings. Next Generation wrote, "The game is well-made, and the plot will keep gamers on the edge of their seats. It's just too bad they won't stay there very long."

Writing for PC Gamer US, Michael Wolf summarized the game as "a fun, quick RPG with a good story." John Altman of Computer Games Strategy Plus found it to be "very engaging" and "a stunning return to form for the Krondor series". He noted that it features "some of the juiciest turn-based battles ever to grace a role-playing game."

Computer Gaming World's Petra Schlunk called the game "completely underdeveloped" and "a lightweight RPG", which failed to match Betrayal at Krondor's quality. However, she believed that it has "a good combat system, a fair story (for what there is of one), and a definite fun factor."

The reviewer from the online second volume of Pyramid stated that "I've eagerly awaited the sequel, Return to Krondor, since the moment I heard it was in development. Unfortunately, Return fails to live up to the standard set by Betrayal."

Mark Asher of CNET Gamecenter reported in December 1998 that the game was "selling well".

The game was a nominee for the Academy of Interactive Arts & Sciences' "PC Role Playing Game of the Year" during the 2nd Annual Interactive Achievement Awards, along with Computer Gaming World's "Best RPG", CNET Gamecenter's "Best RPG of 1998" and GameSpot's "Role-playing Game of the Year"; all were ultimately awarded to Baldur's Gate.
