= Trillium (series) =

Trillium is a series of five fantasy novels by Marion Zimmer Bradley, Julian May, and Andre Norton, each with the word "trillium" in the title. They take place in a post-holocaust world that is hinted to be a colony of earth on another planet where magic works.

The German literature agent Uwe Luserke in 1989 devised the concept of three fantasy authors coming together to collaborate to produce a novel: this would describe three different life stories bound together by a single A-Plot of a story of three princesses, who were robbed of their kingdom and try to survive in a hostile world. Norton, Bradley and May agreed to join in the project. May wrote her vision of the story, which Bantam Books agreed to publish and bought the rights for it. The three collaborated on the first novel, Black Trillium: Bradley wrote Haramis' chapters, May authored Anigel's, and Norton contributed Kadiya's.

May wrote two sequels, Blood Trillium and Sky Trillium, and Norton and Bradley wrote one each - Golden Trillium and Lady of the Trillium, respectively. Lady of the Trillium takes place many years after the first three novels in the series, and tells of the efforts of the only living sister to find and train a successor to lead the world.

A review of Black Trillium in The Rotarian criticized, among other things, "the deadly dull characters, and a boring landscape"; ascribing the issues to the fact that there were "too many cooks". The series is described as having "shallow" characterization, but "intense imagery". Antonio Ballesteros González and Lucía Mora González wrote that while the main characters fell into typical archetypes in high fantasy, they applauded the fact that the main characters were women.

== Novels ==
- Black Trillium (1990, by Marion Zimmer Bradley, Julian May, and Andre Norton)
- Blood Trillium (1992, by Julian May)
- Golden Trillium (1993, by Andre Norton)
- Lady of the Trillium (1995, by Marion Zimmer Bradley)
- Sky Trillium (1997, by Julian May)
