= Guardians of the Flame =

Fantasy book series by Joel Rosenberg

Guardians of the Flame is a portal fantasy series by author Joel Rosenberg, and arguably his best-known work. The series is about a group of college students who participate in a fantasy role-playing game, and are magically transported to the world of the game by their gamemaster.

The first book, The Sleeping Dragon, focuses on the former students struggling to survive in the world of the game. The series progresses with the students choosing to live in the 'game world' and forming their own community, which is in part based on opposition to the ubiquitous slave trade. The series then expands upon the students' "Home" in the fantasy realm and their effecting societal change.

In the later books, the focus shifts from efforts to destroy the slave trade and on to various characters dealing with the changes in the fantasy world wrought by the former students (now mostly 40-somethings). The final three books shift focus to a new set of protagonists, relegating the 'Other Siders' to supporting cast and cameo appearances.

== Novels ==
There are ten novels in the Guardians of the Flame series:

1. The Sleeping Dragon (1983)
2. The Sword and the Chain (1984)
3. The Silver Crown (1985)
4. The Heir Apparent (1987)
5. The Warrior Lives (1988)
6. The Road to Ehvenor (1991)
7. The Road Home (1995)
8. Not Exactly the Three Musketeers (1999)
9. Not Quite Scaramouche (2001)
10. Not Really the Prisoner of Zenda (2003)

The first seven novels also have been reprinted in three omnibus editions collecting books 1–3, 4–5, and 6–7. The Science Fiction Book Club's omnibus editions of the first five books are titled Guardians of the Flame: The Warriors (Books 1–3, 1985) and Guardians of the Flame: The Heroes (Books 4–5, 1989). The Baen Books omnibus editions are titled The Guardians of the Flame (Books 1–3, 2003), Guardians of the Flame: Legacy (Books 4–5, 2004), and Guardians of the Flame: To Home and Ehvenor (Books 6–7, 2004).
