= Krondor: The Assassins =

1999 novel by Raymond E. Feist

- First UK edition
- Author: Raymond E. Feist
- Cover artist: Geoff Taylor
- Language: English
- Series: The Riftwar Legacy
- Genre: Fantasy
- Publisher: Avon Eos (US); Voyager (UK)
- Publication date: September 6, 1999
- Publication place: United States; United Kingdom
- Media type: Print (hardback & paperback)
- Pages: 352 (first edition)
- ISBN: 0-00-224695-3
- Preceded by: Krondor: The Betrayal
- Followed by: Krondor: Tear of the Gods

Krondor: The Assassins is a fantasy novel by American writer Raymond E. Feist. It is the second book in The Riftwar Legacy and was published in 1999 by HarperCollins under their Voyager imprint. It was preceded by Krondor: The Betrayal and followed by the third book in the saga, Krondor: Tear of the Gods.

The series was originally planned to be five books. However, the project was stalled by the owners, due to some differences between Raymond and Sierra Entertainment; nonetheless, the series may come to conclusion through an alternate medium.

== Plot summary ==
Squire James of Krondor must find the cause for many unexplained murders plaguing Krondor. While a war is waged between the Mockers and agents of the Crawler a rival criminal with ties to Kesh. As a further complication eastern nobles arrive the Crown Prince of Roldem and the Duke of Olasko and his son and daughter. William the son of the magician Pug and Katala is commissioned as a Knight-Lieutenant and soon he is escorting the Duke on a hunt which turns out to be an ambush with two attempts on the nobles’ lives one by a group of magicians controlling panthers and another during the night by nighthawks William manages to keep them alive until aid arrives. Meanwhile, James discovered something that will lead him to the main nest of the nighthawks with the help from Ethan Graves. James, William and a few soldiers disguise and approach the supposed location which used to be a Keshian outpost. They discover a back door and enter saving one of their captured scouts and causing havoc while they wait for Prince Arutha and his army. Jimmy is captured and is readied for a sacrifice in a demon summoning. He manages to upset the ritual and the demon is loosed on the nighthawks instead of the prince’s army. William and his squad force the demon to confront Arutha who in turn kills him with his magic imbued sword. The search of the nest results in some dark books, a sealed chest and documents. Arutha then orders a forced march to port Vikor and there he is met by Admiral Trask who takes them swiftly to Krondor. There they open the chest which turns out to be a magical assassin intended for Prince Vladik. The creature is defeated with help from a priest of Prandur but a lot of damage is caused to that wing of the palace. Further inspection and translation of the captured documents reveals that the Duke of Olasko is behind the attempted murder and Arutha sends the eastern nobles back to Roldem under escort. The Mockers are back in power as the Crawler's agents are defeated, Jimmy meets the unconfirmed Upright Man of the Mockers. It is further revealed that Sidi is behind the chaos.
