= Honoured Enemy =

2001 novel by Raymond E. Feist and William R. Forstchen

- Honoured Enemy first edition cover.
- Author: Raymond E. Feist; William R. Forstchen
- Cover artist: Geoff Taylor
- Language: English
- Series: Legends of the Riftwar
- Genre: Fantasy
- Publisher: HarperCollins
- Publication date: August 6, 2001 (UK); June 27, 2006 (US)
- Publication place: United States
- Media type: Print (hardback)
- Pages: 336 (first edition)
- ISBN: 0-00-648388-7 (UK); ISBN 0-06-079283-3 (US)
- OCLC: 48931874
- Followed by: Murder in LaMut

Honoured Enemy (or Honored Enemy in the US, 2001) is a fantasy novel by American writers Raymond E. Feist and William R. Forstchen. It is the first book written in the Legends of the Riftwar and is the only one of the series to be coauthored by William R. Forstchen. The story is set in the fantasy world of Midkemia, which Feist uses as the setting for the majority of his books.

Honoured Enemy is written to coincide with events in Feist's Riftwar Saga, and is a sidebar to the main action of the saga. It focuses on a group of elite soldiers trapped behind enemy lines, forced to ally with one, honourable, enemy to defeat a dishonourable enemy. The novel was written to have resonances with Bernard Cornwell's novels about Richard Sharpe.

It was first published in the United Kingdom by HarperCollins; five years later, HarperCollins published it for the US market.

== Plot introduction ==
Hartraft's Marauders, a band of kingdom raiders, have come across a Tsurani patrol at a garrison overrun by moredhel (dark elves). They band together to survive.

== Discontinuity ==
At the beginning of the book, Duke Borric of Crydee is said to be second in command of the Armies of the West, under Lord Brucal, Duke of Yabon. However, in Feist's original Riftwar novel, Magician, Borric of Crydee is given command of the Armies of the West, with Brucal serving as his second.

The "mad King", Rodric the Fourth, had proposed giving command of the armies to Brucal, at the suggestion of Duke Caldric of Rillanon. However, when the Tsurani attack and overrun some of Brucal's Yabonese garrisons, the King became outraged and instead gives command to Borric.
