= Jane Welch =

Jane Welch (born 1964) is a writer of fantasy short stories and novels.

Jane Welch was born in Derbyshire. After school she worked as a bookseller before going for five years to Soldeu, Andorra in the Pyrenees as a ski teacher.

She is married and has two children and lives in Somerset.

== Bibliography ==
Jane Welch wrote three consecutive Trilogies. The second (The Book of Önd) plays 3 years after the first (Runespell Trilogy) with nearly the same protagonists. The last (The Book of Man) is around 15 years later and is also about the next generation.

=== Runespell Trilogy ===
1. The Runes of War (1995) ISBN 0-00-648025-X
2. The Lost Runes (1996) ISBN 0-00-648200-7
3. The Runes of Sorcery (1997) ISBN 0-00-648201-5

=== The Book of Önd ===
1. The Lament of Abalone (1998) ISBN 0-671-01787-X
2. The Bard of Castaguard (1999) ISBN 0-671-03391-3
3. The Lord of Necrond (2000) ISBN 0-671-77346-1

=== The Book of Man ===
1. Dawn of a Dark Age (2001) ISBN 0-00-711249-1
2. The Broken Chalice (2002) ISBN 0-00-711250-5
3. The Allegiance of Man (2003) ISBN 0-671-77346-1
