= Murder in LaMut =

2002 novel by Raymond E. Feist and Joel Rosenberg

- Murder in LaMut first edition cover.
- Author: Raymond E. Feist; Joel Rosenberg
- Cover artist: Geoff Taylor
- Language: English
- Series: Legends of the Riftwar
- Genre: Fantasy
- Publisher: HarperCollins
- Publication date: June 5, 2002 (UK); July 31, 2007 (US)
- Publication place: United States
- Media type: Print (hardback)
- Pages: 336 (first edition)
- ISBN: 0-00-224720-8 (UK); ISBN 0-06-079285-X (US)
- OCLC: 50176525
- Preceded by: Honoured Enemy
- Followed by: Jimmy the Hand

Murder in LaMut is a fantasy novel by American writers Raymond E. Feist and Joel Rosenberg, the second book in the Legends of the Riftwar series. Set in the fictional world of Midkemia, the book takes place chronologically during the events of Magician.

== Plot ==
Murder in LaMut details the story of Durine, Kethol and Pirojil, three mercenaries who have spent the past twenty five years fighting Tsurani, the Bugs and Goblins. Now having spent a few months on garrison duty, their journey to LaMut should be simple and completely straightforward.

== Release ==
It was first released by Voyager (an imprint of HarperCollins) on June 5, 2002, in the United Kingdom. It was published in the United States by HarperCollins USA in 2008.
