= Faerie Tale =

1988 novel by Raymond E. Feist

- Faerie Tale first edition cover.
- Author: Raymond E. Feist
- Cover artist: Robert Giusti
- Language: English
- Genre: Fantasy
- Publisher: Doubleday
- Publication date: February 1, 1988
- Publication place: United States
- Media type: Print (Hardback & Paperback)
- Pages: 420 pp (first edition)
- ISBN: 0-385-23623-9
- OCLC: 15792544
- Dewey Decimal: 813/.54 19
- LC Class: PS3556.E446 F3 1988

Faerie Tale is a supernatural thriller, falling within the subgenre of contemporary fantasy, by American writer Raymond E. Feist, first published in 1988.

It was translated and published in Dutch as Een Boosaardig Sprookje in 1989. It was translated again into Dutch by Elvin Post in 2000 and published as Elfensprook.

== Plot synopsis ==
Phil Hastings and his family have just moved back to his hometown for some much-needed peace and quiet from the Hollywood scene. As Phil's twin sons, Sean and Patrick, soon discover, there is more to their new home than was expected. Gloria, their mother, senses something, but simply dismisses her concern as stress from their recent move. Gabbie, their older half-sister, meets the man of her dreams, but is also tempted by other men.

Deep in the woods, the Bad Thing and his Master are ready to break free of the centuries-old compact made to keep the Faerie world and the human world at peace. Only through believing the insane and impossible can Sean and Patrick save both worlds from colliding again.

== Critical views ==
The story was reviewed in the Journal of the Fantastic in the Arts and the subject of a master thesis. Professor Jack Zipes at the University of Minnesota, who has published and lectured on the subject of fairy tales, wrote "This message is at the heart of a recent bestseller entitled simply Faerie Tale by Raymond E. Feist. The plot concerns a successful screenwriter by the name of Phil Hasting, who moves into a huge house in rural upstate New York with his wife and three children." Zipes goes on to say: "Feist's novel contains long-winded expositions about magic, Celtic tradition, and fairies and has a secondary plot concerned with Hastings teenage princess daughter, a rich heiress, who falls in love with an all-American graduate student writing his dissertation on a topic related to the occult and magic".

Romance novel author Shona Husk wrote "However, the scary book that has really stayed with me is Faerie Tale by Raymond E. Feist which I also read as a teenager. Some of the images stayed with me for years. I reread it as an adult not that long ago and it is still really creepy."
