= Krondor: The Betrayal =

1998 novel by Raymond E. Feist

- First US edition
- Author: Raymond E. Feist
- Cover artist: Liz Kenyon
- Language: English
- Series: The Riftwar Legacy
- Genre: Fantasy
- Publisher: Avon Eos (US); Voyager Books (UK)
- Publication date: November 1, 1998
- Publication place: United States
- Media type: Print (hardback & paperback)
- Pages: 384 (first edition)
- ISBN: 0-380-97715-X
- OCLC: 39313532
- Dewey Decimal: 813/.54 21
- LC Class: PS3556.E446 K76 1998
- Followed by: Krondor: The Assassins

Krondor: The Betrayal is a fantasy novel by American writer Raymond E. Feist. The first novel in The Riftwar Legacy, it was first published in November 1998. It is a novelization of the computer game Betrayal at Krondor.

== Plot introduction ==
A moredhel (dark elf) known as Gorath has brought news of deadly forces stirring on the horizon. The Nighthawks have begun murdering again, and a group of six magicians known as The Six are at the root of it all. Tsurani gem smugglers led by The Crawler and traitors to the crown are all plotting the fall of the Kingdom of the Isles. Squires James and Locklear must fend off the reunited moredhel while Gorath and his newly gained friend Owyn seek to aid the magician Pug and the kingdom.

== Plot ==
Set nine years after the events of A Darkness at Sethanon, Krondor: The Betrayal follows a new threat to the Kingdom of the Isles. Gorath, a moredhel (dark elf), defects from his people and brings alarming news to the kingdom: the Nighthawks, a notorious guild of assassins, have resumed their killings, and a group of six powerful magicians known as "The Six" are orchestrating a grand conspiracy. Gorath is joined by Owyn Beleforte, a young and inexperienced magician. Together, they uncover that Delekhan, a former lieutenant of the defeated Murmandamus, is rallying the moredhel with the false claim that Murmandamus is still alive and imprisoned beneath Sethanon. Delekhan's goal is to invade the Kingdom and release Murmandamus.

Meanwhile, Squires James (formerly Jimmy the Hand) and Locklear are tasked with defending the kingdom against the renewed moredhel threat. They discover that the criminal underworld is in turmoil due to the rise of "The Crawler," a mysterious figure leading a rival gang to the Mockers and involved in Tsurani gem smuggling.

As the plot unfolds, it's revealed that Makala, a Tsurani Great One (magician), is manipulating events for his own purposes. He deceives Delekhan and uses the chaos as a diversion to enter Sethanon and seek the Lifestone, a powerful artifact.

Owyn and Gorath, with the help of Pug, the kingdom's most powerful magician, confront Makala. They manage to thwart his plans, but not without significant challenges and sacrifices. The story concludes with the immediate threat neutralized, but the kingdom remains vigilant against future dangers.
