= Joel Rosenberg (science fiction author) =

Canadian American author and activist (1954–2011)

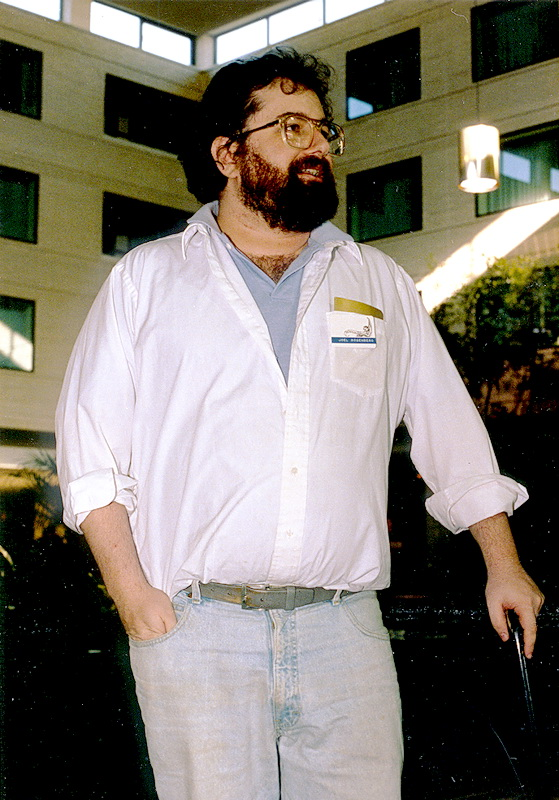
- Rosenberg at Windycon (1987)
- Born: May 1, 1954; Winnipeg, Manitoba, Canada
- Died: June 2, 2011 (aged 57); Minneapolis, Minnesota, U.S.
- Citizenship: United States, Canada
- Education: University of Connecticut
- Occupations: Novelist, handgun instructor
- Spouse: Felicia Herman
- Children: 2 daughters
- Relatives: Carol Rosenberg (sister)
- Writing career
- Language: English
- Period: 1982–2011
- Genres: Science fiction, fantasy, mysteries
- Subjects: Second Amendment advocacy, textbooks for handgun training and regional gun control law (Minnesota, Missouri)
- Notable work: Guardians of the Flame series
- Notable awards: Prometheus Award Best Novel nominee (1992): D'Shai
- Website: ellegon.com

Joel Rosenberg (May 1, 1954 – June 2, 2011) was a Canadian American science fiction and fantasy author best known for his long-running Guardians of the Flame series. Rosenberg was also a gun rights activist.

== Writing career ==
Rosenberg began publishing in 1978 with an op-ed piece in The New York Times favoring nuclear power. His stories appeared in Isaac Asimov's Science Fiction Magazine, Amazing Science Fiction, and TSR's Dragon. His novels have been published by Roc, Avon, Berkley, Tor and Baen Books.

=== Fantasy ===
His first published fiction, "Like the Gentle Rains", appeared in Isaac Asimov's Science Fiction Magazine in 1982. The following year, he published his first novel, The Sleeping Dragon, which was the first in his long-running Guardians of the Flame series. This series placed a group of college students into a fantasy setting similar to a role-playing world. Throughout the series' ten novels, Rosenberg traced these characters, their descendants, and the changes they made to society. He showed no compunction about killing off popular characters.

The "Keepers of the Hidden Ways" trilogy similarly placed people from the real world into a fantasy setting, making heavy use of Norse mythology. A third fantasy series, consisting of the novels D'Shai (1991) and Hour of the Octopus (1994) (both lightly humorous mysteries), was set in an Asian-influenced fantasy world with very strict cultural standards and etiquette.

Paladins, the first in his "Mordred's Heirs" series, was published by Baen Books in September 2004; the second, Knight Moves, was published in November 2006. This series, an "alternate fantasy history", takes place in a world where Mordred defeated King Arthur, establishing the Pendragon Dynasty.

=== Science fiction ===
In addition to fantasy, Rosenberg wrote a number of science fiction novels. Although dealing with different characters, Ties of Blood and Silver (1984) and Emile and the Dutchman (1986) both take place in the same setting. Two other books in this setting, Not for Glory (1988) and Hero (1990), focus on family members of the Metzadan Mercenary Corps from the Jewish- (and others-) settled World of Metzada (Masada).

=== Mysteries ===
In the early years of the 21st century, Rosenberg turned his hand to mysteries, publishing Home Front, the first of his "Sparky Hemingway" mysteries in 2003; the second, Family Matters, was published in early 2004.

=== Themes and influences ===
Rosenberg's novels frequently featured the theme of freedom, particularly in the Guardians of the Flame series, where the initial characters make it their life's goal to abolish slavery in their new world, and the right to keep and bear arms. Other themes included protecting children at all costs, and the message that people can overcome hardships and abuse suffered as children.

His heroes also frequently find inspiration in the heroic figures of ancient Greek literature and of American folklore and history.

== Gun rights advocate ==
Outside of science fiction, Rosenberg was best known as a handgun instructor, gun rights advocate, and author of a manual for people wanting to get a handgun carry permit in Minnesota, Everything You Need to Know About (Legally) Carrying a Handgun in Minnesota, and a similar book for Missouri, Everything You Need to Know About (Legally) Carrying a Handgun in Missouri. His wife recounted that Rosenberg's experience with gun rights was inadvertent. In an interview following his death, she said a neo-Nazi threatened Rosenberg and his family via emails—specifically enough to describe his home—and Rosenberg decided to seek a permit to carry to protect himself.

Rosenberg once suspected that the threats might have something to do with his Metzada novels—"I do write about Jews in space with big guns." But to this day, he doesn't know anything about his stalker, except that he or she is violently anti-Semitic, and unlikely to win any spelling bees.

The legal back and forth between Rosenberg and the Minneapolis police department prompted him to push for a change in the law, from a "may issue" statute to a "shall issue" statute.

While his books of the Guardians of the Flame series have detailed descriptions of firearm technology, he began seriously dealing with self-defense issues after he thwarted a break-in into his house with a .22 LR pistol he kept in his home.

=== Arrest for carrying a handgun ===
In November 2010, Rosenberg openly wore a holstered handgun when coming into the Minneapolis city hall for a meeting with a representative of the city's police chief after providing prior notification as required by state law. After arrival, he was told that a court order prohibited people from carrying a gun anywhere in the building, which houses family and small claims courtrooms on the third floor. He objected, citing the state gun laws, and avoided arrest when he agreed to carry his gun (which the police had confiscated, emptied of ammunition, and returned to him) back to his car. He subsequently filed a complaint against the police sergeant, and posted a YouTube video displaying how many weapons can be concealed on one's body.

In December 2010, he was charged with possession of a dangerous weapon in a courthouse, a felony, and contempt of court, a misdemeanor, arrested, and jailed in lieu of $100,000 bond. Rosenberg was scheduled to stand trial in August for the incident at Minneapolis City Hall, however the case was still pending at the time of his death.

== Personal life and death ==
Rosenberg was born on May 1, 1954, in Winnipeg, Manitoba. He grew up in Northwood, North Dakota, and later moved with his parents and family to Connecticut. He had a Canadian mother and American father, so he enjoyed dual Canadian and American citizenship. He was the oldest brother of Miami Herald reporter Carol Rosenberg.

He attended the University of Connecticut, where he met and married Felicia G. Herman. He studied to be a social worker and counselor, but took to writing after discussing the fantasy role-playing game Dungeons & Dragons with a friend. Rosenberg's occupations, before settling down to writing full-time, included truck driving, care work, bookkeeping, gambling, motel desk-clerking, and cooking. Hobbies included backgammon, poker, bridge, as well as cooking.

In an interview following his death, his wife recalled how he came to write his most famous novel series, The Guardians of the Flame:

He said, "Boy I'd really love to be in the world of my game." And Joel literally woke up in the middle of the night and said, "Like hell you would. This is what it would really be like." And that's how he got the inspiration for starting his best known series, the Guardian of the Flame, in which a group of college-aged gamers are transported to the world of their game and they didn't like it as much as they thought they would ... It was basically a million-word love letter to the industrial revolution.

Herman said Rosenberg was a diabetic, but otherwise in good health. She said he suddenly collapsed and never really recovered, despite efforts to resuscitate him. Rosenberg died June 2, 2011, after a sudden respiratory depression caused a heart attack, brain damage and major organ failures.

After his death, his wife posted on her blog, "In accordance with his wishes, he shared the gift of life through organ and tissue donation." He was survived by his children, Judith and Rachel, and his wife, Felicia.

== Bibliography ==
=== Guardians of the Flame ===
1. The Sleeping Dragon (1983)
2. The Sword and the Chain (1984)
3. The Silver Crown (1985)
4. The Heir Apparent (1987)
5. The Warrior Lives (1988)
6. The Road to Ehvenor (1991)
7. The Road Home (1995)
8. Not Exactly the Three Musketeers (1999)
9. Not Quite Scaramouche (2001)
10. Not Really the Prisoner of Zenda (2003)

=== Keepers of the Hidden Ways ===
1. The Fire Duke (1995)
2. The Silver Stone (1996)
3. The Crimson Sky (1998)

=== Thousand Worlds ===
1. Ties of Blood and Silver (1984)
2. Emile and the Dutchman (1985)
3. Not for Glory (1988)
4. Hero (1990)

=== D'Shai ===
1. D'Shai (1991)
2. Hour of the Octopus (1994)
3. The Last Assassin (not yet published)

=== Mordred's Heirs (incomplete series) ===
1. Paladins (2004)
2. Knight Moves (November 2006)

=== Sparky Hemingway ===
1. Home Front (2003)
2. Family Matters (2004)

=== RiftWar ===
- Murder in LaMut: Legends of the Riftwar, Book II with Raymond E. Feist (2003)
