= Magician (Feist novel) =

1982 fantasy novel by Raymond E. Feist

- Magician first edition cover.
- Author: Raymond E. Feist
- Cover artist: David Gatti (1982); Braldt Bralds (1984)
- Language: English
- Series: The Riftwar Saga
- Genre: Fantasy
- Publisher: Doubleday
- Publication date: October 1982
- Publication place: United States
- Media type: Print (Hardback & Paperback)
- Pages: 545 (first edition)
- ISBN: 0-385-17580-9; Magician: Apprentice: ISBN 0-553-56494-3; Magician: Master: ISBN 0-553-56493-5
- OCLC: 8220861
- Dewey Decimal: 813/.54 19
- LC Class: PS3556.E446 M3 1982
- Followed by: Silverthorn

Magician is a fantasy novel by American writer Raymond E. Feist. It is the first book of the Riftwar Saga and of the wider Riftwar Cycle. Magician was originally published in 1982. The book is set in a Dungeons & Dragons–style fantasy world called Midkemia, originally invented by Feist and his friends during college. The story follows the early life of friends Pug and Tomas as their world is overtaken by war against alien invaders who appear via portals.

== Background ==
Magician is Feist's first published novel, written in the years after he graduated from University of California, San Diego. At university he was a fan of role-playing games and regularly played with his friends. The name and broad idea for Midkemia came from a group of friends who invented the world and some of the core mechanics, such as the magic system. Prior to starting work on Magician, Feist had written some short and "light-hearted" stories about the world they had created.

Feist graduated in 1977 and began work in the healthcare industry. At this time, he had the idea for a novel involving a boy magician and began to write. At some point, Feist lost his job; however, his friends bankrolled the effort to complete Magician. The book was finished by 1979 and published in 1982 by Doubleday books. ' Magician was separated into two volumes for the United States market and published as: Magician: Apprentice and Magician: Master. It was republished in 1992 in a 10th Anniversary edition entitled "The Author's Preferred Edition" containing scenes that had been cut from the original. Feist wanted to re-issue the low circulation original hardcover and his publisher, Lou Aronica, said "he would only do it with new material" so Feist restored some scenes he felt were important while expanding or rewriting other material.

As well as being based on the world invented with his friends at university, Magician has a number of other influences. The book contains a number of common fantasy tropes but also draws from other ideas; writing in Foundation, Hannu Hiilos draws parallels to the work of James Fenimore Cooper and the story of Robin Hood. Feist acknowledged that the Tekumel setting from M. A. R. Barker's Empire of the Petal Throne was the source for much of the world of Kelewan. The original D&D campaign which he based his books on had an invasion of the Midkemia world by Tekumel. As a result, much of the background of Kelewan – the Tsurani Empire, the lack of metals and horses, the Cho'ja, the pantheons of 10 major and 10 minor gods – come from Tekumel. Feist claims to have been unaware of this origin when he wrote Magician.

== Plot ==
In the twelfth year of the reign of Rodric the Fourth, an orphaned kitchen boy named Pug is made an apprentice magician to the magician Kulgan in Crydee. A struggling student of magic, he rises to high station by saving Princess Carline, Duke Borric's daughter, from mountain trolls and becomes a squire of the Duke's court.

Following the discovery of a foreign ship wrecked after a storm and reports of bizarrely dressed warriors appearing in the forests, Pug's liege, Lord Borric sets out for Krondor, the capital of the western realm of the kingdom, to convey the news and ask for aid. Their party is attacked, however, by dark elves and they are rescued by dwarves and their leader Dolgan who leads them through a series of mines to the coast.

Shortly after arriving in Krondor, Lord Borric's band are instructed to carry on to Rillanon, the capital of the kingdom. Once there, however they are refused any help from the King Rodric, who suffers from madness and delusions, and they are turned away.

War erupts between the Midkemians and the otherworldly Tsurani. The Duke's troops engage in a fierce battle in an effort to locate and destroy the rift in spacetime which gives access to the Tsurani, but Pug is captured and taken back through the rift to Kelewan, the Tsurani homeworld, as a slave. After years of stalemate fighting on Midkemia by the two opposing forces, Pug returns as a magician, a Great One, the Tsurani name for master practitioners of magic. Meanwhile, a fellow slave, Laurie, along with a Tsurani warrior, Kasumi, embark on a secret errand of peace from the Tsurani Emperor to King Rodric in Rillanon, but also fail to persuade the mad king.

Discovering that Pug is alive and prospering as a magician, the dying Duke Borric reveals that he has adopted Pug into his family, also giving him an island – Stardock, where Pug is to begin an academy of magic. Duke Borric also reveals that Martin is his son and the older brother to Lyam and Arutha. Upon Borric's death, Lyam becomes Duke of Crydee and commander of the Armies of the West. Shortly after, King Rodric appears at the camp after hearing the news of Borric's death. King Rodric himself then leads a charge against the Tsurani, breaking their ranks and driving them back, but suffering a mortal wound. While dying, the King's sanity seems to return and he apologizes to Lyam and names him heir to the throne.

With Rodric's death, Lyam assumes command and sues for a peace treaty with the Emperor Ichindar. During the peace conference, the two rulers, with Pug as the interpreter, begin on good terms by exchanging gifts. Due to the interference of powerful and mysterious sorcerer Macros the Black, the elves and dwarves mistakenly perceive treachery, and the truce dissolves into an all-out conflict. Macros enlists Pug's help to close the rift once and for all, and the connection between the two worlds is severed, leaving numerous stranded Tsurani soldiers in Midkemia, including Kasumi. The Tsurani, who expect to be put to death as is custom on their world, are instead granted freedom in return for their pledge of service to the Kingdom, and are stationed in LaMut with Kasumi made Earl and given command.

Lyam chooses to reveal Martin's birthright on the eve of his selection and coronation, threatening to throw the Kingdom into turmoil and potential civil war, but Martin relinquishes his claim, making Lyam the rightful king and ending any possibility of dispute.

== Critical reception ==
David Dunham reviewed Magician for Different Worlds magazine and stated that "The book has a grand scale. The action spans two worlds and over ten years, while the characters range from slaves to kings. Despite the diversity, I was interested in all the subplots, and enjoyed the book as a whole."

Colin Greenland reviewed Magician for Imagine magazine, and stated that "There isn't really anything original about Magician. It relies heavily on generalized characters and landscapes; but after a slow start Feist gets everything in perspective, emphasizing the distances and difficulties of stopping this war nobody really wanted to start."

The book placed 89th on the BBC's 2003 list "The Big Read Top 100".

== Adaptations ==
In March 2006, the novel was adapted into a comic book series titled Magician Apprentice, released by Dabel Brothers Productions and Marvel Comics. The first six issues were released as a graphic novel hardcover. After almost one year of collaboration, Dabel Brothers Productions and Marvel parted ways, with all the books, including Magician, being retained by Marvel. In June 2009, the series continued with the release of a 5-part Marvel limited series titled Raymond E. Feist's Riftwar. The series was also released as graphic novel hard cover (Volume 2) by Marvel. Issues 13-18 are planned to be released under the title Magician: Riftwar.

Magician was first optioned for television adaptation in 2018 by BCDF Television. Feist stated he had been in numerous discussions since publication but that this was the first time he was happy to sell the rights. The deal with BCDF fell through, but in February 2022 it was announced that Six Studios had obtained the rights to the first six books in the arc.
