= The Riftwar Saga =

American fantasy novel series

Riftwar Saga
- The three Riftwar Saga books
- Author: Raymond E. Feist
- Language: English
- Genre: Fantasy
- Followed by: Krondor's Sons

The Riftwar Saga is a series of fantasy novels by American writer Raymond E. Feist, the first series in The Riftwar Cycle.

== Works in the series ==
=== Magician ===
"To the forest on the shore of the Kingdom of the Isles, the orphan called Pug came to study with the Master Magician Kulgan. But though his courage won him a place at Court and the heart of a lovely Princess, he was ill at ease with the normal methods of magic. Yet Pug's strange well of power would one day change forever the fates of two worlds. For the dark beings from another world had opened a rift in the fabric of space-time to begin again the age-old battle between the forces of Order and Chaos."

Magician was first published in 1982 as the first book of the Riftwar Saga. Set in the world of Midkemia, Magician became a jumping-off point for Feist's career. Originally reduced in size by his editors, it was re-published (after the author's fame grew) with the omitted text restored.

Magician is now published in two volumes in the US:

1. Magician: Apprentice (ISBN 0-553-56494-3)
2. Magician: Master (ISBN 0-553-56493-5).

The book is still published as a single volume, Magician (ISBN 0-586-21783-5), in the UK.

Feist has acknowledged that the Tekumel setting from M.A.R. Barker's Empire of the Petal Throne was the source for much of Kelewan. The original Dungeons & Dragons campaign which he based his books on had an invasion of the Midkemia world by Tekumel. As a result, much of the background of Kelewan - the Tsurani Empire, the lack of metals and horses, the Cho'ja, the pantheons of 10 major and 10 minor gods - come from Tekumel. Feist claims to have been unaware of this origin when he wrote Magician.

=== Silverthorn ===
"A poisoned bolt has struck down the Princess Anita on the day of her wedding to Prince Arutha of Krondor. To save his beloved, Arutha sets out in search of the mystic herb called Silverthorn that only grows in the dark and forbidding land of the north inhabited by the blood thirsty moredhel also known as the dark elves. Accompanied by a mercenary, a minstrel, a Hadati on a mission of his own and a clever young thief, he will confront an ancient evil and do battle with the dark powers that threaten the enchanted realm of Midkemia."

Silverthorn is the sequel to Magician and was released in 1985.

=== A Darkness at Sethanon ===
"An evil wind blows through Midkemia. Dark legions have risen up to crush the Kingdom of the Isles and enslave it to dire magics. The final battle between Order and Chaos is about to begin in the ruins of the city called Sethanon. Now Pug, the Master Magician sometimes known as Milamber, and his friend Tomas, the Half-Valheru, must undertake an awesome and perilous quest to the dawn of time to grapple with an ancient and terrible Enemy for the fate of a thousand worlds."

This is the final book in The Riftwar Saga, and was released in 1986.

== Characters ==
- Arutha conDoin is a point of view character in Magician and is the protagonist of Silverthorn and A Darkness at Sethanon. He then makes appearances in Riftwar Legacy series and the Krondor's Sons series. He is the youngest son and middle child of Duke Borric of Crydee and Catherine the aunt of King Rodric. He is described as having dark moods and not being as likable as his elder brother Lyam. As a younger son he was expected to either pursue a military career in the border baronies or to be given a minor earldom. He was trained by Swordmaster Fannon, Father Tully and the magician Kulgan. His respect for Kulgan had such an impact on him that later in life he requested for a magician as an advisor in the same manner as his father was advised by Kulgan. As a child he felt his father's belt only once as punishment. He learned that his father expected his orders to be followed.
- Lyam conDoin was born in Castle Crydee the son of Duke Borric conDoin of Crydee and Catherine, aunt of King Rodric IV. He was thought to be the eldest child before Duke Borric, on his deathbed, recognized Martin Longbow as his firstborn son. Lyam also had a younger brother, Arutha, and a younger sister Carline. As a member of the royal house he was a Prince of the Realm from birth. As a child he was tutored by Father Tully, Swordmaster Fannon and Kulgan the magician. He was known for causing trouble during his childhood and had to be punished many times for breaking rules when caught. At the time of Pug's Choosing before the start of the Riftwar, Lyam was 20 years old, being 2 years older than Arutha.
- Macros the Black (birthname Hawk) is a magician who lived on Sorcerer's Isle, a small island surrounded by treacherous currents and many rocks. He is the most powerful and knowledgeable magician in Midkemia and Kelewan. He is not restricted to one path of magic (Greater Path or Lesser Path) but is a follower of all paths. He acted as a mentor to Pug. Details of his life are revealed throughout the series and he recites an autobiography to Pug and Tomas in A Darkness at Sethanon. He claimed to have been born on a distant planet and to have lived for time immemorial. He can see the future, but despite this claims that he is limited to his actions and must play a defined role.
- Pug, known as Milamber on Kelewan, is the most powerful magician in Midkemia save for Macros the Black. He is an orphan from Crydee, and as a child the closest friend of his adoptive father's son, Tomas. Pug becomes Kulgan the Magician's apprentice and is captured while on a raid to examine the Tsurani rift machine. On Kelewan he is initially a slave until his talent for magic is discovered, and he eventually becomes a Black Robe magician on Kelewan. Near the end of the saga Macros says that Pug is neither a Lesser nor Greater Path magician, but like him Pug is a Sorcerer limited only by his own abilities which match those of Macros himself.
- Jimmy the Hand is the son of The Upright Man, although he is unaware of this himself. The Upright Man is leader of the Mockers: Krondor's guild of thieves. Jimmy has grown up on the streets as a thief and a pickpocket; he shows exceptional talent as a thief and is known to be very quick and dextrous. Jimmy's age is unclear although he guesses at 14 or 15. Jimmy meets with Arutha conDoin in Krondor and helps him meet the Mockers to help him escape the city. Later Jimmy accompanies Arutha to retrieve the Silverthorn as an antidote for Anita's poisoning and again when they infiltrate Sethanon to confront Murmandamus. Eventually Jimmy marries the telepath Gamina and becomes Duke of Krondor - a position he joked about for years during the saga.
- Tomas Megarson A point of view character in Magician and Pug's foster brother in Crydee, who inherits the mantle of Ashen-Shugar, a Dragon Lord, who alongside his race ruled Midkemia in antiquity before warring with and being destroyed by the Midkemian gods. Through the machinations of Macros the Black, he becomes part Human, part Dragon Lord and the Warleader and Royal Consort of the elves in Elvandar.
