= List of dragons in literature =

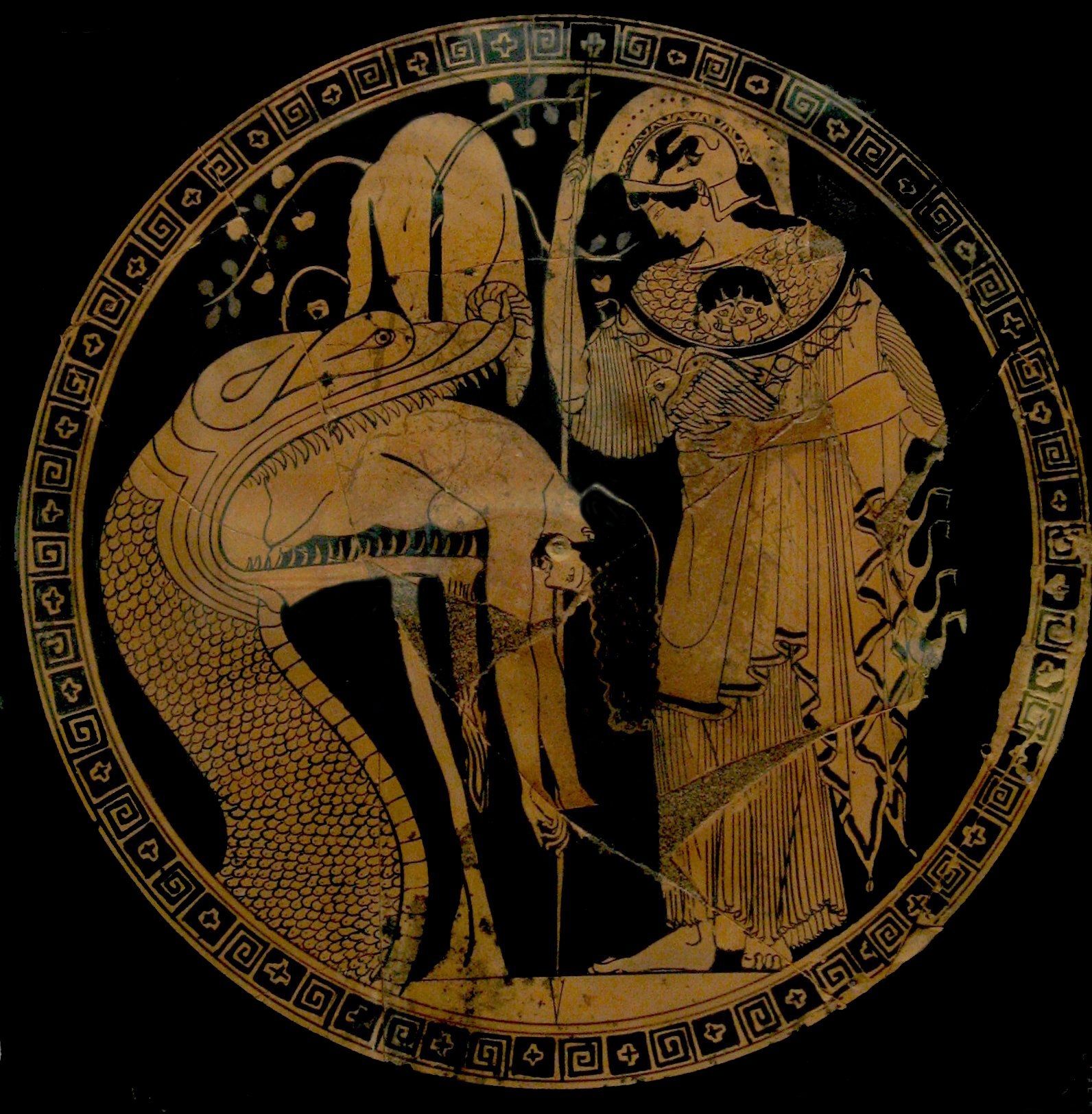
The dragon guarding the golden fleece, as in Apollonius's Argonautica.

This is a list of dragons in literature. For fictional dragons in other media, see the list of dragons in popular culture. For dragons from legends and mythology, see the list of dragons in mythology and folklore.

== Before 1900 ==
=== Antiquity (until fifth century AD) ===
- Epic of Gilgamesh (2150-1400 BC): Humbaba, a dragon slain by Gilgamesh.
- Book of Job (5th century BC?): Leviathan (chapter 41).
- Apollonius of Rhodes, Argonautica (3rd century BC): the dragon guarding the golden fleece (Book 2), and the dragon whose teeth can be sown like seed to make an army grow (Book 3).
- Pseudo-Apollodorus, Bibliotheca (after 1st century BC): the sea monster Perseus slays to rescue Andromeda, and the dragon guarding the apples of the Hesperides (Book 2).
- John of Patmos, Book of Revelation (1st century AD): Satan as a dragon (chapters 12-13, 16:13, 20:2).

=== Middle Ages ===
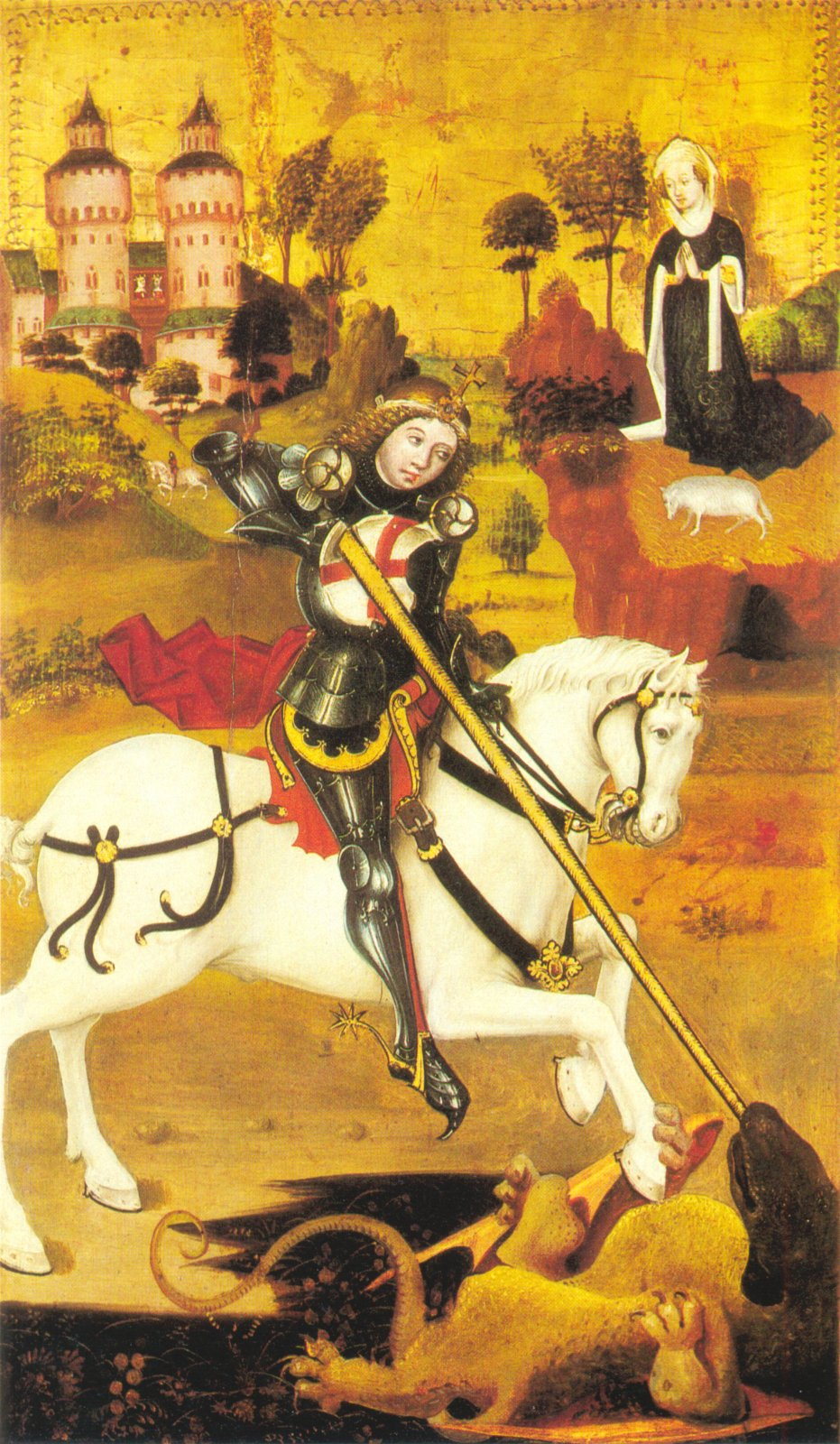
St. George slaying the dragon, as in Jacobus de Voragine's Golden Legend.

- Beowulf (8th - 11th century): The unnamed dragon from the end of the Old English epic, which dies by the combined efforts of Wiglaf and Beowulf.
- Life of Efflamm (late 11th-12th century): The dragon defeated by Efflam and Arthur.
- Geoffrey of Monmouth, Historia Regum Britanniae (c.1136): the dragons in the underground lake whose fighting upsets Uther Pendragon's tower, as revealed by Merlin.
- Jacobus de Voragine, The Golden Legend (c. 1260): the dragon slain by St. George.
- Fáfnismál in the Poetic Edda (by 13th century): Fáfnir.
- Völsunga saga (late 13th century): Fáfnir.
- Sir Gawain and the Green Knight (14th century): The "worms" Sir Gawain battles.
- Amadis de Gaula (14th century): Endriago, a monster Amadis battles.
- Jacques de Longuyon, Les Voeux du Paon (1312): Melusine, a beautiful woman who seems faithful but refuses to take communion in church. When confronted, she turns into a dragon and flees. She has been depicted in Russian art of the 18th century as a woman's head on a dragon's body.

=== Early modern period ===
- Edmund Spenser, The Faerie Queene (1590): Unnamed dragon slain by Redcrosse knight (Book 1, Canto 11-12).
- Christopher Marlowe, Doctor Faustus (1604): The dragons that draw Faustus's chariot.
- Marie Catherine d'Aulnoy, The Green Serpent (1698): A handsome king turned into a green dragon by enchantment.

=== Nineteenth century ===
- Jacob and Wilhelm Grimm, "The Two Brothers" (1812): A seven-headed dragon who demands maidens in one of Grimm's Fairy Tales.
- Fitz-James O'Brien "Sir Brasil's Falcon" (poem; United States Magazine and Democratic Review, XXXIII, 248-257, Sep. 1853): Sir Brasil, exhausted after a long day of hunting, stops to drink from a small pool of water. Each time he raises the cup to his lips, his falcon strikes it from his hand, spilling the water. Enraged, he kills the bird, only to discover moments later that the water had been poisoned by the saliva of a sleeping dragon, revealing that the falcon had been trying to save his life. "The Dragon Fang Possessed by the Conjuror Piou-Lu" (short story, Harper's New Monthly Magazine, XII, 519-526, Mar. 1856): A political satire set in ancient China, the story follows the conjuror Piou-Lu, who acquires a dragon’s tooth that grants him the power of shapeshifting, abilities he uses to manipulate appearances, authority, and social order.
- Lewis Carroll, "Jabberwocky" in Through the Looking-Glass (1871): The Jabberwock, a fearsome dragonlike beast with "jaws that bite", "claws that catch", and "eyes of flame."
- Richard Wagner, Der Ring des Nibelungen (1876): Fafner.
- William Morris, The Story of Sigurd the Volsung and the Fall of the Niblungs (1877): Fafnir.
- Kenneth Grahame, The Reluctant Dragon (1898): A dragon who does not want to act like a dragon.

== Twentieth century ==
By publication date of first installment in a series.

=== 1900s ===
- L. Frank Baum, Land of Oz series (1900): dragons appear in Dorothy and the Wizard in Oz (1908), Tik-Tok of Oz (1914), and The Tin Woodman of Oz (1918).

=== 1910s ===
- Ryūnosuke Akutagawa, "Dragon: the Old Potter's Tale" (1919): a vague shadowy image which observers believe is a dragon ascending to heaven.

=== 1920s ===
- E. Nesbit, The Last of the Dragons (1925): the last dragon on earth, who is tired of being expected to fight a prince for a princess, and becomes the princess's pet instead. Drinks petrol ("that's what does a dragon good, sir") and, at his own request, is eventually transformed by the king into the first aeroplane.

=== 1930s ===
- C. S. Lewis, The Pilgrim's Regress (1933): the cold Northern dragon, slain by John, and the hot Southern dragon, slain by Vertue. The Northern dragon is so greedy that his anxiety for his gold hardly lets him sleep. He recalls eating his wife, saying, "worm grows not to dragon till he eats worm", a loose translation of the Latin saying, Serpens, nisi serpentem comederit, non fit draco. The Guide explains that dragons always live alone because they have become dragons by eating their own kind. Lewis reiterates the notion of cannibalistic dragons in The Voyage of the Dawn Treader (see below).
- J. R. R. Tolkien, world of Middle-earth (1937):
  - Glaurung is described as the Father of Dragons in Tolkien's legendarium, and the first of the Urulóki, the Fire-drakes of Angband (first introduced in The Silmarillion, 1977; also appears in The Children of Húrin).
  - Ancalagon the Black, who is the largest dragon of Middle-Earth (The Fellowship of the Ring, 1954; The Silmarillion, 1977)
  - Scatha the Worm (The Return of the King, Appendix A.II, 1955)
  - Smaug the Golden (The Hobbit, 1937): Smaug is a classic, European-type dragon; deeply magical, hoards treasure and burns innocent towns. Contrary to most old folklore and literature, J. R. R. Tolkien's dragons are very intelligent and can cast spells over mortals. See also dragons listed at Dragon (Middle-earth).

=== 1940s ===
- Ruth Stiles Gannett, My Father's Dragon (1948): a young dragon rescued by a little boy from its abusive animal masters.
- J. R. R. Tolkien, Farmer Giles of Ham (1949): Chrysophylax Dives.

=== 1950s ===
- Robert A. Heinlein, Between Planets (1951): the sentient inhabitants of Venus are huge flightless dragons, who are described as highly intelligent with an enormous aptitude for scientific research, who are very warm and friendly to humans. Since humans can't pronounce their real names, they habitually take - while conversing with humans via a special device - the name of a prominent past human scientist (the book's main dragon protagonist calls himself "Sir Isaac Newton").
- C. S. Lewis, The Voyage of the Dawn Treader (1952), one of the Chronicles of Narnia: The unnamed elderly dragon who dies, and then Eustace Scrubb, who becomes a dragon by magic when he greedily sleeps on the dragon's hoard. Eustace actually eats much of the dead dragon by instinct; Lewis explains that dragons like to eat other dragons, and are therefore usually alone, echoing his thoughts on dragons in The Pilgrim's Regress (see above).
- Ray Bradbury, "The Dragon" (1955): set simultaneously in the recent and distant past, the short story features a pair of knights setting out to fight what they think is a dragon. After they are killed by it, it is revealed that the "Dragon" is actually a steam train.

=== 1960s ===
The dragon Yevaud on the cover of Ursula K. Le Guin's A Wizard of Earthsea.

- Michael Ende, Jim Button and Luke the Engine Driver (1960): Nepomuk, half-dragon by birth – his mother was a hippopotamus –, kind and helpful, later on warden of the Magnetic Cliffs. Frau Mahlzahn (Mrs. Grindtooth): A pure-blood dragon and the main villainess of the story. Very knowledgeable, runs a school for human children in Sorrowland, likes to torment lesser beings with her power.
- Oliver Postgate and Peter Firmin, The Ice Dragon (1962), one of the books in The Saga of Noggin the Nog: an ice dragon whom Noggin intends to fight, but instead helps.
- Ursula K. Le Guin, world of Earthsea (1964): the portrayal of dragons undergoes significant changes from book to book. In the original, they resemble Smaug, with unbounded greed for hoards of precious jewelry; later, they grow in stature and nobility, to become virtual demi-gods who speak the "Language of Creation" as their mother tongue. Later still, it is revealed that they share an ancestry with humanity, and that some rare humans (always women) can change into dragons at will (or they may be considered as dragons who can take human form at will). In contrast to the dragons of C.S. Lewis's fiction, the dragons of Earthsea do not eat each other. Like Tolkien's Smaug, they are susceptible to drowning.
  - Kalessin the creator of the world of Earthsea. (The Farthest Shore, 1972)
  - Orm, the great dragon who slew and was slain by the legendary Warrior Mage Erreth-Akbe.
  - Orm Embar, Orm's descendant, who died battling the evil magician Cob on the eastern shores. (The Farthest Shore, 1972)
  - Yevaud (A Wizard of Earthsea, 1968)
  - Orm Irian and Tehanu, each of whom was a dragon in human form who acted as a diplomat between her races.
  - Various additional dragons
- Ruth Manning-Sanders, A Book of Dragons (1965): 14 fairy tales about dragons.
- Anne McCaffrey, Dragonriders of Pern series (1967): The (genetically engineered) Dragons of Pern. Dragons in Pern (genetically modified fire-lizards, which were Pernese natives) are ridden by "dragonriders" to protect the planet from a deadly threat, the Thread. The dragons include Faranth, Mnementh, Ramoth, and Ruth.
- Clifford D. Simak, The Goblin Reservation (1968): A beautiful dragon from a previous universe plays a key role in the novel's unexpected denouement.
- Tilde Michels, Kleiner König Kalle Wirsch (1969): The six-legged dragon Murrumesch, who long ago stole the uranium-stone from the earth manikins.

=== 1970s ===
- John Gardner, Grendel (1971): Grendel's omniscient advisor, revealing to Grendel the meaning of the universe, and enchanting Grendel to be impervious to man-made weapons. (Based on the unnamed dragon from Beowulf.)
- Astrid Lindgren, The Brothers Lionheart (1973): Katla.
- Gerald Durrell, The Talking Parcel (1974): Tabitha, last remaining dragon and Keeper of the Eggs.
- Gordon R. Dickson, Dragon Knight series (1976):
  - Bryagh, a major character. (The Dragon and The George, 1976)
  - Jim Eckert, main character in the series: reluctant knight and magician, part-time dragon and de facto member of the Cliffside dragons
  - Gorbash, major character in The Dragon and The George novel and minor character in the rest of the series: largest dragon of the Cliffside dragons, grandnephew of Smrgol
  - Secoh, major character in the series: a member of the Mere-Dragon clan, which have become diminutive as the result of a blight
  - Smrgol, major character in The Dragon and The George novel: an elderly and respected member of the Cliffside dragons and the paternal granduncle of Gorbash
  - Various other dragons.
- Piers Anthony, Xanth novels (1977): Stanley Steamer, the Gap Dragon; and Stella Steamer, Stanley Steamer's female counterpart.
- Diana Wynne Jones, Charmed Life (1977): Chrestomanci's pet dragon (rescued from poachers who killed its mother).
- Robert Asprin, MythAdventures series (1978): Gleep.
- Michael Ende, The Neverending Story (1979): Falkor (Fuchur in the original German version), the luckdragon, and Smerg, an evil dragon.
- Robert Don Hughes, Pelmen the Powershaper series (1979–1985): Vicia-Heinox, the two-headed dragon.

=== 1980s ===
The dragon Maur, on the cover of Robin McKinley's The Hero and the Crown.

- Robert Munsch, The Paper Bag Princess (1980): a dragon who destroys Princess Elizabeth's kingdom and kidnaps her beloved Prince Ronald. Princess Elizabeth defeats the dragon by getting him to show off his full skills, exhausting him.
- David and Leigh Eddings, The Belgariad (1982) and The Malloreon series (1988): Unnamed dragons. There used to be three: two males and one female but the males killed each other in the first mating season leaving the female alone for millennia.
- Raymond E Feist, Riftwar trilogy (1982–1986): Rhuagh, Ryath, Shuruga and others.
- Laurence Yep, Dragon series (1982–1992): Shimmer the dragon princess.
- Jane Yolen, The Pit Dragon Trilogy series (1982–2009): Heart's Blood and several others.
- Terry Brooks, Magic Kingdom of Landover novels (1986): Strabo.
- R. A. MacAvoy, Tea with the Black Dragon (1983) and Twisting the Rope (1986): Mayland Long, who used to be a Chinese dragon.
- Alan Dean Foster, Spellsinger series (1983–1994): Falameezar-aziz-Sulmonmee, a friendly Marxist dragon.
- Terry Pratchett, Discworld novels (1983), notably The Colour of Magic (1983) and Guards! Guards! (1989): Errol, Ninereeds and other dragons. Pratchett's Discworld novels describe two types of dragons: Noble Dragons (Draco Nobilis) which are typical European-type dragons, which are extinct by the time the books take place but can be summoned by magic or created with a lot of magic and imagination; and the Swamp Dragons (Draco Vulgaris), which are the size of small dogs, bred as pets, and, due to their complex, fire-producing anatomy, have a tendency to self-destruct.
- Steven Brust, Vlad Taltos novels (1983–present): jheregs, tiny dragon-like creatures, and dragons, huge reptiles that cannot breathe fire but have tentacles that pick up psychic impressions.
- Steven Brust, To Reign in Hell (1984): Belial, one of the Firstborn angels, takes the form of a colossal, insane dragon living beneath a volcanic mountain range.
- Tracy Hickman, and Margaret Weis, Dragonlance universe (1984): Cyan Bloodbane, a green dragon; Khisanth, Skie, Malystryx, Pyros, Flamestrike, Silvara, Khirsah — among others
- Robin McKinley, The Hero and the Crown (1984): numerous small dragons, which cannot speak, and the huge, sentient dragon Maur, which is a malevolent force even after death.
- Barbara Hambly, Dragonsbane (1985): Morkeleb, the black dragon around whom revolves the plot.
- Paul Edwin Zimmer, A Gathering of Heroes (1987), part of the Dark Border series: Komanthodel, the ancient evil dragon.
- Melanie Rawn, the Dragon Prince series (1985–1994):
  - Azhdeen, a dragon belonging to Pol.
  - Elisel, a dragon belonging to the Sunrunner Sioned.
  - Various unnamed dragons.
- Stephen King, The Eyes of the Dragon (1987): Niner, the dragon that Roland killed; its head is mounted on the wall of his sitting room.
- Donn Kushner, A Book Dragon (1987): Nonesuch, the last in a long line of dragons, learns to adapt as humans become more prevalent in the world. He survives through his unusual ability to change size.
- Lucius Shepard, stories (e.g., The Man Who Painted the Dragon Griaule, 1984; The Scalehunter's Beautiful Daughter, 1988): Griaule, a gigantic dragon, paralyzed and moribund yet still capable of casting a baleful influence.
- Martin Baynton, Jane and the Dragon (children's book series, 1988, later adapted into a TV show): features a twist on the conventional tale, with a friendly and chatty dragon who befriends a teenage girl training to be a knight.
- R.A. Salvatore, novels set in the Forgotten Realms (1988–present):
  - Icewind Dale Trilogy (1988–1990): Ingeloakastimizilian, also known as Icingdeath, is a White Frost Dragon who fights Drizzt Do'Urden and Wulfgar.
  - Streams of Silver (1989): Shimmergloom the shadow dragon is mentioned.
  - Sojourn (1991), Servant of the Shard (2000): Hephaestus the red dragon is a minor character.
- Tad Williams, the Memory, Sorrow and Thorn series (1988–1993): Igjarjuk, the ice dragon. (The Dragonbone Chair, 1988)
- Susan Fletcher, The Dragon Chronicles novels (1989–1996): Byrn, Pyro, Embyr, Synge, and others.
- Gary Gentile, A Time For Dragons (1989), Dragons Past (1990), and No Future For Dragons (1990): Various dragons.
- Rick Cook, Wizard's Bane (1989), LRD, little red dragon guards the compiler book.
- Jean Marzollo, Baby Unicorn and Baby Dragon (1989): A young dragon named Moon to match the crescent mark on his head. Became a great friend of Star after the Eight-Horn Friendship Spell in the prequel The Baby Unicorn.

=== 1990s ===
- Patricia C. Wrede, Enchanted Forest Chronicles series (1990–1993): Various dragons.
- Jackie French Koller, "The Dragonling" series (1990–1998): Zantor and various other dragons.
- Robert Jordan, The Wheel of Time series (1990–2011): A depiction of a Chinese dragon as the sigil of the Dragon, Lews Therin Telamon.
- Andre Norton and Mercedes Lackey, The Halfblood Chronicles series (1991-2002): Alamarana and various other dragons feature prominently.
- Christopher Rowley, Bazil Broketail book series (1992–1999): Bazil Broketail and many others.
- Bruce Coville, Jeremy Thatcher, Dragon Hatcher (1992): Tiamat.
- Andrzej Sapkowski, The Witcher series (Sword of Destiny novel, 1992): Villentretenmerth, the golden dragon - intelligent shape-shifting creature, the only dragon among others (green, black, red and white) that can tolerate humans and even take their form. Also known as Borch Three Jackdaws in his human form.
- Tamora Pierce, The Immortals quartet (1992–1996): Skysong, as well as Flamewing, Wingstar, Diamondflame, Icefall, Steelsings, Jadewing, Jewelclaw, Moonwind, Rainbow and Riverwind.
- Dick King-Smith, Dragon Boy (1993), Albertina, Montague, and Lucky Bunsen-Burner, Gerald Fire-Drake and his family
- R.A. Salvatore, The Spearwielder's Tale trilogy (1993–1995): Robert (also known as Robert the Wretched), the antagonist.
- Various Authors Star Wars Legends (1993-2014): Duinuogwuin (also known as Star Dragons) first appeared in the novel Queen of the Empire and later in several other works.
- Terry Goodkind, The Sword of Truth (1994): Scarlet, the red dragon Gregory, Scarlet's hatchling that Richard saves in Book One.
- Bruce Coville, the series The Unicorn Chronicles (1994): Ebillan and Firethroat, dragons.
- Daniel Hood, Fanuilh series of books (1994–2000): Fanuilh, a miniature dragon and familiar.
- Harlan Ellison and Robert Silverberg, "The Dragon on the Bookshelf" (1995): Urnikh.
- Robin Hobb, Realm of the Elderlings series (1995): dragons and humans coexisted in the distant past. Their essences became mixed in some cases, producing scaled humans referred to as Elderlings, or small, rubbery-skinned dragons, called "Others" and treated as abominations. Humans carved living dragon statues out of special living stone; these statues were later used as a weapon against the Outislanders by King Verity Farseer of the Six Duchies.
  - Hobb's dragons would begin life as sea serpents, who would swim upriver to a special beach where they would cocoon themselves and hatch as dragons the next year. After a natural disaster changed the shape of the land, the serpents could no longer find their cocooning grounds and remained in the sea, as the cataclysm wiped out all but two of the dragons.
- Graham Edwards, the Ultimate Dragon Saga trilogy (1995–1997): Cumber, Fortune, Wraith and many other dragon characters.
- Frank E. Peretti, The Oath (1995): Giant, silver, unnamed dragon; a pact was made with this demonic creature by the citizens of a mining town in the northwest
- George R. R. Martin, A Song of Ice and Fire series (1996–present), and the CCG based on the books: Drogon, Viserion, and Rhaegal, the dragons hatched by Daenerys Targaryen. Also, Balerion the Black Dread, Meraxes and Vhaghar, ridden by Aegon the Conqueror and his sisters in the conquest of Westeros.
- Cornelia Funke, Dragon Rider (1997): Firedrake, Slatebeard, Maia, Shimmertail and several unnamed dragons. The cannibal Nettlebrand from the same book may also be considered a dragon due to his appearance.
- Elizabeth Kerner, Song in the Silence (1997): the Kantri, a society of telepathic dragons, including Akhor, the king; Shikrar, his soulfriend; Kedra and Mirazhe, the first new parents in centuries, and Idai, and old and wise admirer of Akhor.
- J. K. Rowling, "Harry Potter" series (1997–2007): Various dragons (including Norwegian Ridgebacks, Hungarian Horntails, Swedish Short-Snouts, Common Welsh Greens, Hebridean Blacks, and a Chinese Fireball - see magical creatures in Harry Potter). Dragons are mentioned throughout the Harry Potter books, a baby dragon appears in the first installment and dragons later play a significant role in the fourth and seventh. They are portrayed as having strong magic (even in their blood), but they do not exhibit any hints of intelligence or self-awareness. Within the series, dragons are considered very dangerous by most characters (Rubeus Hagrid being a notable exception) and private ownership of dragons is illegal.
  - Norbert, Hagrid's baby dragon, in Harry Potter and the Philosopher's Stone
  - Hungarian Horntail, Welsh Green, Swedish Short-snout, and Chinese Fireball in Harry Potter and the Goblet of Fire
  - Ukrainian Ironbelly that guards some of the deepest vaults of Gringotts in Harry Potter and the Deathly Hallows
- T. A. Barron, The Fires of Merlin (1998), The Mirror of Merlin, and The Wings of Merlin: Valdearg the Wings of Fire and his daughter Gwynnia (named after Tiamat).
- Anne Bishop, Black Jewels Trilogy (1998): Lorn, Prince of Dragons and Keeper of the Knowledge of the Blood, Race that created the Race of the Blood and Bestower of the Blood Jewels.
- Joanne Bertin, Dragon and Phoenix (1999): Kelder Orolin, Linden Rathan and other dragonlords (or weredragons) in The Last Dragonlord (1998) and Minue (a water dragon).
- Christopher Golden, Strangewood (1999): Fiddlestick, a small musically emotive dragon.
- James Clemens, the series The Banned and the Banished (1999): various dragons:
  - Ragnar'k, the stone dragon of A'loa Glen
  - Conch and others, seadragons bonded to the Mer'ai
- Steven Erikson, the Malazan Book of the Fallen series (1999–present): Soletaken and Warren-ruling dragons.
- Harry Turtledove, Darkness series (1999): in this magical analogue of the Second World War, the dragons are beasts, highly pugnacious and under complete human control. In the storyline they are the analogue of fighter planes and dragon riders are obviously intended to represent fighter pilots of the Luftwaffe and the RAF.
- Jeffrey A. Carver, science fiction novels set in the Star Rigger Universe: Dragons in the Stars (1992) and Dragon Rigger (1993); dragons live in the hyperdimensional "Flux" of interstellar space, most notably Highwing.

== Twenty-first century ==
Arranged by publication date of the first installment in a series.

=== 2000s ===
- Chris d'Lacey, "The Last Dragon Chronicles" series, starting with The Fire Within (2001): Gadzooks, G'reth, Gretel, Gawain, and other dragons. These dragons are made of clay and brought to life by the fire/essence (known as the "auma") of one of Earth's last true Dragons, called Gawain. It is possible that Gawain's line might rise to full draconicity as a result of the actions taken by the student David Rain, his girlfriend the sibyl Zanna, the clayworkers Liz and Lucy Pennykettle, scientist Anders Bergstrom, and the witch Gwillanna.
- Cressida Cowell, How to Train Your Dragon series (2003)
- Emily Rodda, Deltora Quest's third installment (2000–2004): Dragons are portrayed as very intelligent and proud; as being divided into seven distinct tribes; as having the capacity to reproduce by parthenogenesis; and as each having a virtue to which it adheres, such as Strength, Honor, Luck, Faith, Hope, Joy, and Truth.
- Emily Rodda, Deltora Quest 3 (2000–2004): The various Gem Dragons.
- Neal Asher, several books (e.g., Gridlinked, 2001): The entity Dragon.
- Robin Hobb, The Tawny Man trilogy (2002–2003): Icefyre and Tintaglia, the last remaining dragons; and The Rain Wild Chronicles (2009–2013): Various dragons
- Christopher Paolini, The Inheritance Cycle (2002–2011):
  - Glaedr (Brisingr, 2008)
  - Saphira (Eragon, 2002)
  - Shruikan (Eragon, 2002)
  - Thorn (Eldest, 2005)
  - Fírnen (Inheritance, 2011)
- Robin Wayne Bailey, Dragonkin series (2003): The dragons of Wyvernwood.
- Margaret Weis, Dragonvarld trilogy (2003–2005): Maristara, an evil black dragon; Braun, her grandson; Draconas, the walker, a dragon in human form; and various other dragons.
- Tony DiTerlizzi and Holly Black, The Spiderwick Chronicles (2003–2004) and Beyond the Spiderwick Chronicles (2007–2009):
  - In The Spiderwick Chronicles serial (2003–2004), Book Five, The Wrath of Mulgarath: The snake-like poisonous dragons raised by the ogre Mulgarath as his weapons of mass destruction. Mentioned as the European Wyrm variety.
  - In Beyond the Spiderwick Chronicles serial (2007–2009), Book Three, The Wyrm King: A Hydra, a dragon or snake-like creature with multiple heads and gills appears, called the Wyrm King.
- Mercedes Lackey, the Dragon Jousters series (2003–2006): Avatre and several others.
- Mercedes Lackey and James Mallory, The Obsidian Trilogy (2003–2006): Ancalader, the dragon bonded to Jermayan.
- Keith Baker, world of Eberron (2004):
  - Eberron, one of the progenitor dragons. Eberron's bones compose the world.
  - Khyber, one of the progenitor dragons. Khyber rules the underworld and his children are the demons and monsters of the world.
  - Siberys, one of the progenitor dragons. Siberys is the "Dragon Above", his remnants compose the Ring of Siberys, a golden ring of crystal-like shards that glitters in the night sky.
- Bryan Davis, Dragons in Our Midst series (2004): Clefspeare, Hartanna, Firedda and others.
- Christopher Pike, Alosha series (2004): Dragons also start life as legless, wingless, tailless, and without fire; in this form, they are known as Kouls. Later in life, a Koul develops legs, a tail, wings, and fiery breath. To do this, a Koul must risk its life for protection of others, learn to swim, and take a literal "leap of faith" from a high place.
- Donita K. Paul, Dragonkeeper Chronicles (2004–2008): Celisse, Metta, Gymn, Greer and others.
- E. E. Knight, the Age of Fire series (2005): Auron (later AuRon), the gray, scaleless dragon. Also included are Natasatch (his mate), Irelia (his green mother), AuRel (his bronze father), Jizara (green sister), Wistala (green sister), NooMoahk (black dragon), Rugaard (copper dragon), and many others.
- Gareth P. Jones, Dragon Detective Agency (2006): Dirk Dilly.
- Naomi Novik, Temeraire series (2006): Temeraire and the other dragons of the Napoleonic Wars.
- James A. Owen, The Chronicles of the Imaginarium Geographica series (Here, There Be Dragons, 2006): Samaranth, an Eastern-type dragon who offers guidance to the main characters. Also various other dragons.
- Janet Lee Carey, Dragon's Keep (2008), Dragonswood (2012), and In the Time of Dragon Moon (2016)
- Dave Freer, Dragon's Ring (2009): Fionn, a black dragon who plans to destroy Tasmarin.
- Catherine Rayner, Sylvia and Bird (2009).
- Philip Reeve, No Such Thing As Dragons (2009).
- Rick Riordan, Percy Jackson series
  - The Sea of Monsters (2006): The dragon Peleus guards the Golden Fleece at Camp Half-Blood.
  - The Titan's Curse (2007): The dragon Ladon guards the apples of the Hesperides.
- Jessica Day George, Dragon Slippers series (2006–2009): introduces several dragons (Theoradus, Amacarin, Feniul, Shardas) who befriend the main character, Creel, as well as her friends.
- Andrew Peterson, The Wingfeather Saga series (2008-present): introduces several dragons and Sea Dragons (Yurgen)
- Lev Grossman, The Magicians trilogy (2009-2014): Dragons appear in the series; in the second book Quentin meets and speaks with a dragon who warns him about the return of the Old Gods.

=== 2010s ===
- Stephen Deas, Memory of Flames series (2009–2011): centered around a world inhabited by dragons, which are ridden by knights. Plot centers around their re-awakening consciousness.
- Tui T. Sutherland, Wings of Fire series (2012-present): epic children's fantasy series which features dragons as the heroes of each story; features hundreds of dragons.
- Marie Brennan, Lady Trent series (2013–2015): Lady Trent's memoirs on how she first started studying dragons in a Victorianesque world.
- Laurence Yep & Joanne Ryder, A Dragon's Guide to the Care and Feeding of Humans (2015): told from the point of view of a dragon named Miss Drake.
- Julie Kagawa, Talon series (2014–2018): revolves around dragons with the ability to disguise themselves as humans and an order of warriors sworn to eradicate them.
- George R. R. Martin, The World of Ice & Fire; The Untold History of Westeros and the Game of Thrones (2014): A list of dragons mentioned in the book on page 33; Balerion, Vhagar, Meraxes and page 81; Sunfyre, Dreamfyre, Tessarion, Morghul, Shrykos, Syrax, Caraxes, Vermax, Arrax, Tyraxes, Stormcloud, Meleys, Moondancer, Silverwing, Seasmoke, Vermithor, Sheepstealer, Grey Ghost, The Cannibal, Morning. Brief bios of the dragons on page 81.
- Todd Lockwood, "The Summer Dragon (Evertide #1), released on May 3, 2016, heavily features dragons."
- Kazuo Ishiguro, The Buried Giant (March 2015)
- James Bennett, Chasing Embers (September 2016): The Ben Garston novels from Orbit Books, dragons at war in human form.
- Jasper Fforde: The Last Dragonslayer (nov 2010)
- Jillian Boehme: Stormrise (Sept. 2019)
- Rachel Hartman: Seraphina (2012) and Shadow Scale (2015) describe the story of Seraphina, who is half-dragon and half-human. The companion novel, Tess of the Road (2018), tells the story of Seraphina's half-sister, Tess.
- Brandon Mull, Fablehaven (2006-2010) and Dragonwatch (2017-2020) series: Fablehaven: Secrets of the Dragon Sanctuary and Fablehaven: Keys to the Demon Prison both have dragons in them and the sequel series, Dragonwatch, has many more.
- David Cartwright, Dragon Fire (The Camelot 2050 Trilogy #2) (August 2018). A resurgent Morgana le Fay uses a biomechanical dragon as a weapon of mass destruction against the forces of Camelot.

=== 2020s ===
- Rebecca Yarros, The Empyrean Series (2022 - Present ). A series focusing on a military school with a branch of Dragon Riders.
- Eoin Colfer: Highfire (2020), also titled The Last Dragon on Earth
- Kate Quinn, The Astral Library (2026) Former foster child Alix Watson encounters a hidden world of magical books and a dragon librarian.
