= Sione =

Sione is a given name and a surname. It may refer to:

== Given name ==
=== A – K ===
- Sione Asi (born 1998), New Zealand rugby union player
- Sione Fakaʻosilea (born 1987), Tongan rugby union player
- Sione Faletau (born 1988), Tongan rugby union player
- Sione Faumuina (born 1981), New Zealand rugby league player
- Sione Feingatau ʻIloa (born ?), Tongan politician
- Sione Fifita (born 1990), Tongan rugby union player
- Sione Finefeuiaki (born 1979), Tongan rugby league player
- Sione Fua (born 1988), American football player
- Sione Havili (born 1998), New Zealand rugby union player
- Sione Houma (born 1994), American football player
- Sione Jongstra (born 1976), Dutch triathlete
- Sione Kalamafoni (born 1988), Tongan rugby union player
- Sione Katoa (disambiguation), several people

=== L – S ===
- Sione Latu (born 1971), Tongan-born Japanese rugby union player
- Sione Lātūkefu (1927–1995), Tongan historian and reverend
- Sione Lauaki (1981–2017), Tongan-born New Zealand rugby union player
- Sione Lea (born 1987), Tongan rugby union player
- Sione Lousi (born 1989), New Zealand rugby league player
- Sione Mafileo (born 1993), New Zealand rugby union player
- Sione Masima (born 1993), Australian rugby league player
- Sione Mata'utia (born 1996), Australian rugby league player
- Sione Misiloi (born 1994), New Zealand rugby union player
- Sione Molia (born 1993), New Zealand rugby union player
- Sione Ngū Manumataongo (a.k.a. Fatafehi Tuʻipelehake; 1922–1999), Tongan prince, politician, poet, and composer
- Sione Piukala (born 1985), Tongan rugby union player
- Sione Po'uha (born 1979), American football player, coach, and businessman
- Sione Sangster Saulala (born 1974), Tongan broadcaster, politician, editor, and schoolteacher
- Sione Sialaoa (born 1956), Samoan weightlifter and Olympics competitor

=== T – Z ===
- Sione Tahaafe (born 1958), Tongan rugby union player
- Sione Taione (born 1971), Tongan politician
- Sione Takitaki (born 1995), American football player
- Sione Taufa (born ?), American rugby league player
- Sione Teaupa (born 1992), Tongan-born Japanese rugby union player
- Sione Timani (born 1984), Tongan rugby union player
- Sione Tongia (born 1987 or 1988), Tongan rugby league player
- Sione Tovo (born 1988), Tongan rugby league player
- Sione Tui (born 1999), Australian rugby union player
- Sione Tuʻamoheloa (born 1980), Tongan rugby union player
- Sione Tuihalamaka (born 1991), American football player
- Sione Tuipulotu (disambiguation), several people
- Sione Uluʻilakepa (born 1965), Tongan bishop
- Sione Vailahi [see: The Barbarian (wrestler)] (born 1958), Tongan-born American wrestler
- Sione Vailanu (born 1995), Tongan rugby union player
- Sione Vaiomoʻunga (born 1989), Tongan rugby union player
- Sione Vaki (born 2001), American football player
- Sione Vatuvei (born 1983), Tongan-born Japanese rugby union player
- Sione Vaveni Taliaʻuli (born ?), Tongan-born Australian boxer and Olympics competitor
- Sione Vuna Fa'otusia (1953–2021), Tongan politician

== Surname ==
- Alesana Sione (born 1966), Samoan weightlifter and Olympics competitor
- Eric Sione (born 1992), New Zealand rugby union player
- Faalelei Sione (born 1996), Australian rugby union player
- Joan Sione (born 1986), New Zealand rugby union player
- Lusi Sione (born ?), New Zealand rugby league player
- Tomu Sione (1941–2016), Tuvaluan politician

== In fiction ==
- Sione Tapili, a main character in the New Zealand animated series bro'Town (2004–2009)

== See also ==
- Sioned, an unrelated Welsh given name with a similar spelling
- Sione's Wedding, a 2006 comedy film
