= Stone and Sun =

2001 novel written by Graham Edwards

- Author: Graham Edwards
- Cover artist: Les Edwards
- Language: English
- Genre: Fantasy novel
- Publisher: Voyager Books
- Publication date: December 2001
- Publication place: United Kingdom
- Media type: Print (Hardback & Paperback)
- Pages: 465 pp
- ISBN: 0-00-651072-8
- OCLC: 48835206
- Preceded by: Stone and Sea

Stone and Sun is a fantasy novel written by Graham Edwards. The novel was first published in 2001 by Voyager Books (UK) and HarperPrism (US). It is the third book in the Stone trilogy, which also includes Stone and Sky and Stone and Sea. The trilogy is a follow-up to Edwards' Ultimate Dragon Saga trilogy, and is loosely connected via various plot threads.

== Plot summary ==
In this final tale of Amara, the nineteenth-century historian Jonah meets a man from his own world; one Tom Coyote, who originates from the year 1980. Along with Coyote, the bizarre group of companions (including a wood-spirit inhabiting a flying boat, a once-immortal basilisk, and several others who are mostly human) ascend the world-sized monolith of Amara to find what awaits at the top, and each of them prepare to face their own demons.
