= Stone and Sea =

2000 novel written by Graham Edwards

- Author: Graham Edwards
- Cover artist: Les Edwards
- Language: English
- Genre: Fantasy novel
- Publisher: Voyager Books
- Publication date: August 2000
- Publication place: United Kingdom
- Media type: Print (Hardback & Paperback)
- Pages: 439 pp
- ISBN: 0-00-651071-X
- OCLC: 43540096
- Preceded by: Stone and Sky
- Followed by: Stone and Sun

Stone and Sea is a fantasy novel written by Graham Edwards. The novel was first published in 2000 by Voyager Books (UK) and HarperPrism (US). It is the second book in the Stone trilogy, which also includes Stone and Sky and Stone and Sun. The trilogy is a follow-up to Edwards' Ultimate Dragon Saga trilogy, and is loosely connected via various plot threads.

== Plot summary ==
The book further covers the adventures of Jonah Lightfoot, a man stolen from his own world when he witnesses the 1883 eruption of Krakatoa. He and his unwitting companions cross the world of Amara, a vertical landscape where to fall from the world's surface is to die, or worse. They find a massive ocean, somehow held in place without the water falling into the abyss, and must then figure out a way to cross it. On their journey they discover the true nature of Amara; meet mermaids, forest spirits and shapeshifting creatures; cross paths with dragons both good and evil; delve into a world built of memory; and stumble across artifacts from Earth's past, present, and future.
