= Graham Edwards (writer) =

English author

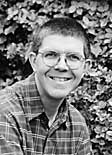
Author Graham Edwards

Graham Edwards (born 1965) is an English author of fantasy and crime novels. His most popular books have generally featured dragons as their central characters.

Born in Somerset and raised in Bournemouth, Edwards studied art and design. He went on to work as a graphic designer and animator before developing his writing career in the 1990s. He often includes illustrations with his novels. Edwards now lives in Nottingham with his wife and two children.

== Body of work ==
Edwards' major body of work consists of two related fantasy trilogies: the Ultimate Dragon Saga trilogy and the Stone trilogy (also known as the Amara trilogy).

The former series of books is a fantasy work set in times before humans, and as such there are no human characters in the novels. The dragons are sentient and, much like the rabbits and moles in Richard Adams' Watership Down and William Horwood's Duncton Wood respectively, they are anthropomorphised, displaying a large array of human characteristics, relationships and emotions.

The latter series is set - although not in an actual Earthly time period - parallel to the late 19th century. Its events are triggered by the eruption of Krakatoa in 1883, and feature human characters prominently, although the stories are also populated with other races such as dragons. This series can be read as a standalone trilogy, although minor plot and character connections to the Ultimate Dragon Saga mean that prior reading of the first trilogy will give a richer appreciation of the second.

Since finishing the Stone trilogy, Edwards has written several short stories, published in Realms Of Fantasy magazine. In 2008 he published his first crime novel, Runaway Minister, under the pseudonym Nick Curtis. It was published by Black Star Crime books. Two years later, he published a sequel, Close Enemies.

In 2014, Edwards published the hybrid low fantasy detective novel Talus and the Frozen King under his own name.

== Bibliography ==
=== Novels ===
==== Stand Alone Novels ====
- Talus and the Frozen King (2014)

==== The Ultimate Dragon Saga trilogy ====
- Dragoncharm (1995)
- Dragonstorm (1996)
- Dragonflame (1997)

==== The Stone trilogy, or the Amara trilogy ====
- Stone and Sky (1999)
- Stone and Sea (2000)
- Stone and Sun (2001)

==== Writing as Nick Curtis ====
- Runaway Minister (2008)
- Close Enemies (2010)

==== Writing as J.D. Rinehart, the Crown of three trilogy ====
- Crown of three (2015)
- The Lost Realm (2016)
- A Kingdom Rises (2017)

=== Short stories ===
- "The Wooden Baby" (in Realms of Fantasy magazine, April 2005)
- "Dead Wolf in a Hat" (in Realms of Fantasy magazine, October 2005)
- "Syren" (in Realms of Fantasy magazine, February 2007)
- "Still Point" (in Realms of Fantasy magazine, December 2007)
- "Girl in Pieces" (in Realms of Fantasy magazine, April 2008)
- "Riding the Drop" (in Jim Baen's Universe, February 2009)
- "Castellia" (in The Magazine of Fantasy & Science Fiction, November/December 2021)
