= Dragonflame =

1997 novel by Graham Edwards

- Author: Graham Edwards
- Cover artist: Geoff Taylor
- Language: English
- Genre: Fantasy novel
- Publisher: Voyager Books
- Publication date: October 1997
- Publication place: United Kingdom
- Media type: Print (Hardback & Paperback)
- Pages: 441 pp
- ISBN: 0-00-648233-3
- OCLC: 37864201
- Preceded by: Dragonstorm

Dragonflame is a fantasy novel written by Graham Edwards. The novel was first published in 1997, by Voyager Books (UK) and HarperPrism (US). It is the final book in the Ultimate Dragon Saga trilogy. The book contains loose connections, and foreshadowing to Edwards' later series, the Stone and Sky trilogy.

In 1997, the British Fantasy Society nominated Dragonflame for "best novel of the year".

== Plot summary ==
Aria joins the sinister Cult of the Last Circle, an underground dragon community led by the evil Scarn. Scarn worships the Flame, which he believes has been sent to replace the charm lost from the world. After rescuing Aria from the Cult, Fortune escapes with his friends across the sea to Ocea. Scarn gives chase using the power of the Flame to travel great distances as if by magic.

Meanwhile, Aria's son Wyrm (who has no wings) has set out on a pilgrimage around the world. There is a comet in the sky and Wyrm is obsessed with the Day of Creation. Along the way he encounters a tribe of 'natural faeries' who have lost both their magic and their wings - these are actually cavemen. Later Wyrm uncovers some ancient charm that enables him to grow wings, and he sets out for the Last Circle.

Eventually, all the dragons meet in a huge crater in Ocea (the Last Circle) where a great battle ensues between Scarn's dragons (mutated by the evil power of the Flame) and Fortune's new allies, the mirror-dragons. At the climax of the battle, Scarn escapes. The comet drops from the sky and hits the crater. Everyone escapes except Wyrm, who is transformed from a single dragon into millions of birds.

Fortune finally defeats Scarn. The dying power of the Flame opens a portal into a strange sideways world. Brace and Ledra go through the portal, which disappears. The sideways world is in fact Amara (Stone trilogy), introduced properly in Stone and Sky.
