= Tuipulotu =

Tuipulotu or Tuʻipulotu is both a given name and a surname. Notable people with the name include:

- Tuipulotu Katoa (born 1999), Tongan rugby player
- Albert Tuipulotu (born 1979), American rugby player
- ʻAmelia Afuhaʻamango Tuʻipulotu, Tongan nurse
- Carwyn Tuipulotu (born 2001), Welsh Zealand rugby player
- Christian Tuipulotu (born 2001), Tongan rugby player
- Lote Tuipulotu (born 1987), American rugby player
- Marlon Tuipulotu (born 1999), American football player
- Mosese Tuipulotu (born 2001), Australian rugby player
- Patrick Tuipulotu (born 1993), New Zealand rugby player
- Peter Tuipulotu (born 1969), Tongan gridiron football player
- Sateki Tuipulotu (born 1974), Tongan rugby player
- Sione Tuipulotu, multiple people
- Sisilia Tuipulotu (born 2003), Welsh rugby player
- Tuli Tuipulotu (born 2002), American football player
