= Stone and Sky =

Stone and Sky may refer to:

- Stone and Sky (Edwards novel), a 1999 novel by Graham Edwards
- Stone and Sky (Aaronovitch novel), a 2025 novel by Ben Aaronovitch in the Rivers of London series
- Stone and Sky (movement), a Colombian literary movement from 1939
- Piedra y cielo (English: Stone and Sky), a 1919 poetry book by Juan Ramón Jiménez
