= Dragonstorm =

1996 novel by Graham Edwards

- Author: Graham Edwards
- Cover artist: Geoff Taylor
- Language: English
- Genre: Fantasy novel
- Publisher: Voyager Books
- Publication date: September 1996
- Publication place: United Kingdom
- Media type: Print (Hardback & Paperback)
- Pages: 441 pp
- ISBN: 0-00-648022-5
- OCLC: 35784574
- Preceded by: Dragoncharm
- Followed by: Dragonflame

Dragonstorm is a fantasy novel written by Graham Edwards. The novel was first published in 1996 by Voyager Books (UK) and HarperPrism (US). It is the second book in the Ultimate Dragon Saga trilogy. This book introduces the dragon Archan, who returns in a larger role in Edwards' Stone trilogy.

In 1996 the British Fantasy Society nominated Dragonstorm for Best Novel of the year.

== Plot summary ==
The survivors from Dragoncharm have established a new dragon community on the island chain of Haven. Dragonstorm opens as Brace, Cumber and an ex-charmed dragon called Thaw lead an expedition to rescue the dragons still trapped in the canyon at Aether's Cross. Fortune and Gossamer remain on Haven, with their new daughter Aria. Fortune and his allies battle to prevent the community being split apart by the renegade Hesper.

Meanwhile, the basilisk Ocher is seeking out his lost companions. Once gathered, the six basilisks - known as the Deathless - plan one last wielding of charm to bring about their own destruction.

Brace and Cumber reach an ancient citadel built by the basilisks and inhabited by a blind ex-charmed dragon called Archan. The citadel's towers are mobile in time, constantly fading in and out of past, present and future. Archan seduces Thaw and imprisons the others. She has learned about the basilisks' plans and is scheming to steal their immortality.

The basilisks are gathering what is left of the world's magic. A giant river of charm forms in the sky, flowing to the north pole, which the dragons call the Crest of the World. Hesper taps into this charm and convinces many of the Haven dragons that the magic is back. The community splits apart as the river of charm causes a great storm. The whole world starts changing shape.

The shifting of the continents transports the whole of Haven island to Archan's citadel. Cumber and the others are rescued, but Fortune's daughter Aria is snatched by Archan and taken to the time-towers. The temporal effects cause Aria to grow to adulthood in the blink of an eye. Archan tricks Thaw into raping Aria, then kills him. Archan wants Aria to bear a perfect infant dragon to accompany Archan into immortality. She takes Aria to the north pole, ready for the ritual that will make her immortal.

Brace and Cumber's party journey to a land of glaciers where they find the skeleton of Aether, the troll after whom the canyon of Aether's Cross was named. All the basilisks meet at the north pole and perform the ceremony of the Gathering of the Deathless. Fortune arrives just in time to save Aria from Archan. The basilisks achieve their goal and Archan becomes immortal, but her body is destroyed. She disappears into an iceberg, where she remains trapped and helpless, yet unable to die.

All the basilisks are dead except Ocher, who is now mortal. Now life is precious, Ocher decides he wants to live a little longer. Brace arrives with the dragons he's just freed from Aether's Cross. Aria's egg brings wingless infant Wyrm into the world. The surviving dragons wonder if Wyrm represents what the future holds for their species, which is hovering on the brink of extinction.
