= Dragoncharm =

1995 novel by Graham Edwards

- Author: Graham Edwards
- Cover artist: Geoff Taylor
- Language: English
- Genre: Fantasy novel
- Publisher: Voyager Books
- Publication date: February 1995
- Publication place: United Kingdom
- Media type: Print (Hardback & Paperback)
- Pages: 504 pp
- ISBN: 0-00-648021-7
- OCLC: 32131532
- Followed by: Dragonstorm

Dragoncharm is a fantasy novel written by Graham Edwards. The novel was first published in 1995 by Voyager Books (UK) and HarperPrism (US). It is the first book in the Ultimate Dragon Saga trilogy, and its sequels are Dragonstorm and Dragonflame.

Dragoncharm is written entirely from the point of view of a range of dragon characters as they struggle to survive in a world that is rejecting magic. Much like the animal characters in Richard Adams's Watership Down and William Horwood's Duncton Wood, the dragons are anthropomorphised, displaying a large array of human characteristics, relationships and emotions.

In 1995, the British Fantasy Society nominated Dragoncharm for Best Novel of the year.

== Plot introduction ==
The novel is populated by two species of dragons:

- Charmed dragons are of an older, magical order and have four legs as well as wings. However, due to their proficiency with magic, wings are not needed to fly and thus these limbs take on a more decorative role. They also use magic to breathe fire and change their bodies at will.
- Natural dragons use no magic, and have just four limbs, using their forelimbs to fly rather like bats, or wyverns. Many Natural dragons show fear and hatred of the Charmed, and around the time of the events of the novel, they greatly outnumber the older, dying race.

== Plot summary ==
The story begins with the destruction of the dragon settlement, South Point, home to Fortune, a young Natural dragon. Fleeing, he joins with the Charmed dragon Cumber on a desperate quest to reach the fabled citadel of the Charmed at Covamere. As they journey, the two dragons witness the growing conflict between the Charmed and the Naturals, which threatens to culminate in all-out war between the two species. They encounter signs everywhere that magic is leaving the world: trolls lie dying beneath the landscape, giants build enigmatic stone circles and faeries are evolving into proto-humans.

The two dragon armies come together. Leading the Naturals is an insane dragon named Shatter, while the Charmed commander is a military monster called Wraith. Wraith's ambition is to breach the Maze of Covamere, at the very centre of which lies the ultimate power of the Seed of Charm.

Fortune and Cumber, along with a growing band of companions from both races (including Gossamer, Brace, Scoff, Velvet, and others), thread their way through the conflict, seeking a way to unite both dragon species to face the greater threat that faces them all: the world is turning its back on magic and all dragons are facing extinction. When Fortune finally faces Wraith inside the Maze of Covamere, both dragons learn a dark secret from their shared past. When the ancient, immortal basilisk Ocher enters the fray, even Fortune is tempted by the power offered by the Seed of Charm.

Dragoncharm ends in the aftermath of the turning of the world, the very moment when magic departs, leaving in its wake the natural world we humans know today. The story, following the lives of the surviving dragons, is picked up in Dragonstorm.

== Film, TV or theatrical adaptations ==
Dragoncharm was optioned for a movie in 1996 by UK production group Dandelion Distributions. It was to be directed by Bob Keen and followed by a TV series of thirteen episodes. The adaptation would have been a mix of CGI and animatronics, using real locations as backgrounds. However nothing came of the plans and the rights are once again the author's property.
