= The Willows at Christmas =

1999 children's novel by William Horwood

- Front cover of the first edition
- Author: William Horwood
- Illustrator: Patrick Benson
- Language: English
- Genre: Novel; Fantasy; Children's literature
- Publisher: HarperCollins, St. Martin's Press
- Publication date: 20 October 1999
- Publication place: United Kingdom
- Media type: Print (hardback & paperback); Audiobook
- Pages: 244 pp
- ISBN: 0-00-225604-5
- Preceded by: The Willows and Beyond

The Willows at Christmas is a children's novel by English writer William Horwood, first published in 1999. It is the fourth book of the Tales of the Willows series, a collection of four sequels to Kenneth Grahame's 1908 novel The Wind in the Willows.

The Willows at Christmas is set after the events of The Wind in the Willows but before The Willows in Winter. It is illustrated by Patrick Benson and includes full-page colour pictures.

== Synopsis ==
The twelve days of Christmas are fast approaching and Mole is planning to enjoy every one of them with his River Bank friends, but he is horrified and upset to learn that nobody looks forward to the festive season. So when the normally cheerful Mr Toad despairs at the arrival of Mrs. Ffleshe, a quite impossibly rude house guest, Mole must do something about it. But the plan he hatches with Ratty, Badger and Otter to rescue Toad goes horribly wrong. With the prospect of Christmas in gaol and a trial for capital offences soon to follow, Mole will have to work hard if he is to salvage something of the Christmas spirit for his friends.
