= Vampire Earth =

Series of science fiction/dark fiction novels

- Way of the Wolf cover
- Way of the Wolf; Choice of the Cat; Tale of the Thunderbolt; Valentine's Rising; Valentine's Exile; Valentine's Resolve; Fall With Honor; Winter Duty; March in Country; Appalachian Overthrow; Baltic Gambit
- Author: E. E. Knight
- Cover artist: Koveck
- Country: United States
- Language: English
- Genre: Vampire, science fiction, dark fantasy
- Publisher: Roc Books
- Published: 2003 – 2014
- Media type: Paperback
- Followed by: Age of Fire

Vampire Earth is a series of science fiction/dark fantasy novels by American writer E. E. Knight.

== Plot ==
The story begins in 2065 in a post-apocalyptic American setting. Forty-three years earlier, in 2022, an alien race known as the Kurians triggered a series of natural disasters (as well as artificial ones) that enabled them to gain control of the planet and subjugate humanity. A plague has reduced the world population to 25% of its pre-cataclysm level; nuclear explosions have created a mild form of nuclear winter, cooling the Earth, and smaller events everywhere have added to the chaos. In America, the New Madrid fault let go, destroying much of the Midwest. Major rivers such as the Mississippi have been unleashed.

=== Story ===
In the year 2022 CE, a seemingly immortal extraterrestrial race called "Kurians" has wrested control of the Earth from its inhabitants. The Kurians derive their endless lifespans from draining the "aura" (life energy) of other life forms. To facilitate this addiction to life energy, the Kurians employ avatars known as "Reapers".

Following the Kurian takeover, many humans made the decision to serve the new overlords. These traitors, known as Quislings, are set up as members of the police and supervisory government for the Kurian Order. Nearly every other human who is not a Quisling is known as a Territorial, and is either a slave scratching out a living in various trades, or fighting with rebel organizations such as the Southern Command.

After a time, the Kurian Order reduced Earth to a technological and social Dark Age, with only the few remaining pre-2022 machines and transportation networks surviving, with most of these under Kurian control. As an incentive to good and loyal service to the Kurian Lords, Quislings are awarded bonds of various lengths of years (3, 5, 10), which protect the wearers from the Reapers. Even more sought after is the "Brass Ring". A Brass Ring ensures that one never has to fear being randomly taken by the Reapers at night, although it can be revoked and cannot be passed to one's children.

Pockets of resistance do exist, however. The main rebel group fighting the Order at the beginning of the series is known as Southern Command. A formal military (though classified by the Order as terrorists) is charged with the defense of the Ozark Free Territory; Southern Command would be doomed were it not for the Hunters.

== Setting ==
The Cave

Strategic Air Command's old headquarters at Offutt Air Force Base is the home of the Twisted Cross. Some of the hangars have been rebuilt and SAC's old catacombs reoccupied. A new general has come, with men in strange uniforms. A reverse swastika flag flies, its spider-like black-and-white design stark and forbidding against the blue of Omaha's skies.

Chicago

Chicago is a Kurian stronghold. Chicago is not only one of the most secure and best organized Kurian cities, it is also the most corrupt. It is the only Kurian Zone where one may buy a Brass Ring. Also, Chicago is one of the trading hubs of the Kurian empire where goods are traded for humans, which are the only commodity that the Kurians recognize.

New Columbia

The city of Little Rock never recovered from the nuclear blast inflicted on it in the death throes of the Old World. Though the fires went out and the radiation dispersed, the only life to return permanently was nonhuman. The new rulers have a grand vision of a rail, road, and river traffic hub built on the ruins of the old. The Rocks (Little Rock and North Little Rock) have been renamed New Columbia with the motto "Crossroads of the Future".

Omaha

The Old World transportation hub set in the wide, wooded valley of the Missouri is a sad shadow of its former self. Like its sister St. Louis farther down the wide Missouri River, Omaha is now the breeding ground for assorted Grogs and human scoundrels.

== Character types ==
=== Kurians ===
The Kurians are a branch of an alien race known as the Lifeweavers. They naturally have very long lives of thousands of years and have learned to increase their lifespan indefinitely by absorbing vital aura from other living beings. This was discovered from the remnants of a civilization known as the Pre-Entities. After a civil war with the other Lifeweavers, the Kurians launched a large scale invasion of earth with an engineered virus known as "ravies" and triggering several natural disasters during a time of economic breakdown known as the New Depression. National governments quickly collapsed and the Kurians set up a new form of government, similar to feudalism, with Kurian lords controlling specific areas and maintaining their status quo through fear and intimidation. Though they have some interest in culture, their main goals are survival and power. Often they are compared to drug addicts, never looking much further than the next "fix" of vital aura from their human cattle. This of course belies their tenacity and power wielded through their Reapers.

Reapers

The Kurians created these vampiric monsters that stalk the night, selecting victims for their insatiable masters. Each Reaper is an extension of its master, and when it pierces the heart of a victim with its long, flexible tongue to drain the unfortunate's blood, its connection to the Kurian controller transfers the vital aura. The Reapers are nigh-unstoppable; not only garbed in bullet-resistant cloaks but also possessing superhuman speed, agility, strength and resilience. Their blood is a powerful coagulant when exposed to air, sealing wounds almost instantly, and the bones of a Reaper are hard enough to deflect most bullets. The most terrifying aspect of the Reaper, however, is its ability to stalk prey by sensing out "lifesign", the energy given off by a living being. The greater the emotional distress of the target, the easier it is for the Reapers to find them.

=== Lifeweavers ===
The Kurians' cousin species, the Lifeweavers, are natural shapeshifters and masters of genetic manipulation of living beings. As they long ago lost the ability to engage in warfare, they developed a means of turning human beings into weapons.

=== Hunters ===
The Hunters are divided into three castes: Wolf, Cat, and Bear. The Lifeweavers alter the bodies of the Hunters to grant them enhanced senses, reflexes and endurance.

==== Wolves ====
The most numerous of the Hunters, David Valentine initially belongs to this caste. Wolves are long-range patrollers, able to run almost tirelessly for hours on end, and possessing the ability to "harden" their senses to the sensory ability akin to a wolf. Wolves engage in guerrilla warfare against the Kurian Order; killing Reapers to weaken the Kurians, smuggling out humans, destroying resources of the Order, and fighting in rapid hit-and-run engagements with the Grog and human soldiers of the Order.

==== Bears ====
These are the near-unstoppable shock troops of the Human resistance. When modified by a Lifeweaver to become a Bear, a human soldier becomes "a walking tank", fighting like a berserker of old and possessing tremendous strength and power. Bear physical capabilities are actually on par with the Reapers themselves, able to fight and even kill Reapers in single combat. They also possess an incredible faculty for healing, to the point of regenerating nerve damage and internal organs that have been lost. Lost & Found, a Bear introduced in Valentine's Rising, actually revives from beyond clinical and physical death. Bears induce a trance-like state called "going Red", which seems to induce the berserker rage for which the Bears are famous.

Hunters are not limited to one caste. There are mentions of a few who have obtained all three types of alteration. Valentine's own trainer (after becoming a Wolf) was a Cat, but mentions how he was "a Wolf before [Valentine was] born". Many Cats actually start out as Wolves, much like Valentine. Valentine eventually becomes part of all three castes.

== Characters ==
David Stuart Valentine

Also known by the nickname "Ghost", Valentine is the main character and all the stories are told from his point of view.

When Valentine was eleven years old, he witnessed the aftermath of a Quisling attack on his home. All his family was killed in the attack, leaving him the only survivor of the massacre. Father Max, a Catholic priest and his father's old friend, took him in and raised him. Valentine is brought up in Father Max's library, where books work to fill the void left in his life. David learns later that his father, Lee Valentine, was a soldier in Southern Command.

Valentine possesses a sixth sense that is sometimes referred to as the "Valentingle", first as a joke and later taken seriously. This sense allows him to feel the presence of Reapers being controlled by Kurians.

Valentine suspects that the changes in Hunters created by the Lifeweavers may be hereditary.

Valentine starts off as a Wolf, but due to some events that are hinted to be caused by Alessa "Smoke" Duvalier becomes a Cat and finally becomes a Bear after an ill-fated meeting with a Lifeweaver in Pacific Command.

Valentine also has a daughter with First Lieutenant Malia Carrasca in Jamaica and is raising the Reaper who was born from Gail Post as his son whom he calls Blake.

Malia Carrasca

Carrasca is the acting captain of the gunboat Thunderbolt. She lives in Jamaica and meet Valentine when he comes to the island on his way to Hispaniola, searching for an unknown weapon against Kur (later revealed as "Quickwood"). Valentine arrives on the Thunderbolt and convinces Carrasca's grandfather Commodore Jensen to let him use the powerful ship (one of the strongest still in existence) in his search. In exchange, the ship becomes the property of the Jamaican resistance, and Carrasca becomes the new commander of the Thunderbolt. Over the course of their adventure, Valentine and Carrasca fall in love. When Valentine gets back to the Ozarks, Ahn-Kha gives him a note from Carrasca, telling him he will be a father soon. Valentine looks forward to the day he can go to see his daughter. Valentine returns to North America being unable to find a home in Jamaica.

Ahn-Kha

Ahn-Kha is a Golden One who looks like a seven-foot cross between a short-haired bear and an ape with pointed, expressive ears. He is one of Valentine's most constant companions. Valentine and Ahn-Kha consider each other brothers and would die for each other.

Ahn-Kha was born on Earth, 41 years before the beginning of Choice of the Cat, one of the first of his clan to be brought to this world after his people had settled. The Golden One clans and the Gray Ones' tribes were brought to this world to do the dying while winning the victory for the Kur.

Although many people who encounter Ahn-Kha dismiss his intelligence due to his resemblance to the Gray Ones, his own species of Grog is generally as intelligent (if not more so) than humans. Ahn-Kha is a great source of wisdom, something Valentine relies on almost as much as he relies on Ahn-Kha's strength.

Valentine and Ahn-Kha are separated at the end of Valentine's Exile, Ahn-Kha drawing off pursuit to allow Valentine and the others in their group, which included Smoke and Gail Post, to escape. Valentine believes Ahn-Kha to be dead after several years without news. Valentine later hears rumors of a Golden One leading a rebellion in Appalachia and swears to investigate the rumours hoping to find his missing "brother".

Alessa Duvalier aka Smoke

At age 16, Duvalier ran away from the Great Plains Gulag after burning a police van and then killing two policemen, after one of them attempted to rape her. Taking all their possessions she could carry, she then escaped by crawling through a swamp and heading for the mountains. She is taken in by the Duvalier family. When a raid on Leavenworth is planned, she is recruited as a scout. She becomes friends with a Cat named Rourke and later becomes his disciple.

Eight years later, she meets Valentine at the battle of Little Timber Hill where she helps him and his men escape their besieged position. After David's decision to resign from the Wolves, Duvalier recruits him to be a Cat.

Duvalier is one of the most fervent believers in the Lifeweavers, believing them to be almost godlike. She is often shown to be in awe of them, and it would seem willing to do anything for them. Although in later works she is shown to have the overall cause as foremost in mind, Duvalier is a highly divided character who is led by both extreme passion and extreme pragmatism. She shows overt anti-social behavior due to her traumatic childhood and has difficulty forming romantic bonds with men. Duvalier is among the zealots of the new order, who will do anything for the cause with special emphasis on the Lifeweavers.

Eveready

Valentine first meets Eveready in the Yazoo Mississippi, where Eveready was responsible for training Valentine and several other Wolves in how to mask their lifesigns and evade Reapers. He has killed at least 71 Reapers (at the time of Valentine's Exile), counted by the sets of teeth he wears as a necklace, but believes that those who actually go after Reapers without extreme advantage are fools.

He later appears in Valentine's Exile as a recluse, hunting Reapers and other Kurian operatives along a specific stretch of land he calls home. He gives Valentine and Duvalier the equipment necessary to help track down William Post's wife, Gail. Eveready is shown to have at one time been one of the most fervent believers of the cause, converting several Quislings and fomenting revolution. He lost his ardor after being betrayed by a trusted confederate and now operates a one-man war against Quislings agreeing only to train new Wolves, but not accepting any other specific assignments.

Eveready's name comes from the battery company by the same name. He uses the batteries as a calling card for the Kurians so that they know which kills are his.

Narcisse aka Sissy

Narcisse is a woman Valentine encounters in the Caribbean and is disfigured: two fleshy stumps are all she has left of her legs, and one arm ends in a knob at her wrist. She got these injuries from trying to run away. She helps Valentine escape and he takes her with him piggyback style.

Narcisse claims to practice voodoo, but it's more like hoodoo, with her herbs doing "magic".

William Post

Post is a former Quisling officer who Valentine converts to the side of Free Territories. Valentine encounters Post while acting as the first officer on the Thunderbolt, a Quisling ship. Post follows Valentine acting as his lieutenant until he becomes injured in a manner that leaves him unable to fight. Post carries guilt of leaving his former wife, Gail, and sends Valentine to look for her once he is injured.

Arsie or RC

Arsie or RC, supposedly named after the old Royal Crown Cola truck she was found in as a baby, is a Blue Dome girl. The character Arsie or RC is notable because she was named for Merile (aka RC) of the Vampire Earth forum. She won a contest to have a character named for her.

Blake

Blake is Gail's Reaper son being raised secretly by Narcisse in Valentine's absence. He is having trouble fighting his natural urges to feed and is aging much faster physically than he is mentally. He is shown to possess the entire gamut of human emotions, including love and attachment, which he clearly feels for Valentine. Valentine has taken to calling Blake his son, and Blake returning the attachment calling him Poppa. Although Narcisse is the one who raises him, Blake only acknowledges Valentine as a parent.

Blake is Valentine's only motivation to rejoin "the cause" and sets out to find Lifeweavers in order to buy Blake's freedom, otherwise Blake will be sought out, captured and studied.

== Books ==
There are eleven books in the Vampire Earth series. Summaries are presented in chronological order.

=== Way of the Wolf ===
This book begins with Valentine's childhood and his introduction to the Kurians and the Reapers, and continues through his experience in the Southern Command Ozark Free Territory labor battalion. This experience comes to a brutal climax as Harpies (flying creatures controlled by the Kurians) attack his posting and kill several people, including a close friend. Valentine tracks the Harpies to their lair in an old boat and destroys it. This earns him promotion to the Wolves.

Working as a messenger, Valentine finds himself trapped behind enemy lines after investigating a new Kurian installation. Disguising himself and an injured comrade, he takes shelter with the Carlsons, a family of Quislings, and falls in love with their daughter, Molly. A Kurian operative selects Molly for his own. Molly subsequently kills the man and is captured and taken to The Zoo, a center for Kurian operations in the heart of Chicago. The Zoo is a horrific place where many women labeled as criminals meet their end. Valentine tracks down then rescues Molly. The book ends as Valentine and Molly finally reach the Ozarks again.

=== Choice of the Cat ===
Valentine, now a lieutenant in the Wolves, is left in charge of men in an ambush by Grog cavalry. A Cat named Alessa Duvalier helps Valentine and his men retreat. Valentine is subsequently faced with a court martial, as his commanding officer attempts to obfuscate his own incompetence by sacrificing Valentine's career. Valentine is offered an alternative to the court martial: he can resign his officer's commission. While initially determined to face the court, Valentine changes his mind when Duvalier offers to take him in as a Cat. Valentine resigns and follows Duvalier to Ryu's hall, where he is again enhanced, and receives the training necessary to survive as a spy-saboteur behind enemy lines.

Following his training, Valentine and Duvalier venture into the Kurian Zone in search of a mysterious group called the Twisted Cross. The Twisted Cross is somehow connected to reports of Reapers that not only speak to one another (normally all Reapers in a given group are unified by the will of their Kurian controller) but also use firearms. The two Cats quickly bond on the trail, but their relationship is strained by Valentine's decision to help cattle-driving nomads, the Eagles, to fight against the Twisted Cross, rather than withdraw as a Cat would. Duvalier leaves him behind and continues her intelligence-gathering mission. Following the Eagles' victory over the Twisted Cross unit, Valentine continues his search for the Cross alone. In the ruins of Omaha, he encounters a badly wounded Grog named Ahn-Kha. Ahn-Kha reveals that he speaks English and that he is a member of a Grog tribe called "The Golden Ones". The Golden Ones helped the Kurian Order in taking over Earth, but were eventually betrayed by their former benefactors and now live as virtual slaves to the Twisted Cross.

Valentine and Ahn-Kha become extremely close friends, to the point that they regard one another as brothers. The Cat joins the Grog in beginning a revolt against the Twisted Cross overseers and their puppet Principle Elder. During the battle, Valentine stumbles upon the secret behind the new, strange Reapers: they are controlled by men, not Kurians, and relieves them of their duty.

Valentine and Ahn-Kha's quest to free the Golden Ones ends in Valentine leading a virtual one-man assault on the heart of the Twisted Cross, destroying what appears to be the majority of the human Reaper controllers. Badly wounded in the battle, he is captured and brought before the mysterious leader of the Twisted Cross, a man known only as "The General". The General relates to Valentine that he is an immortal, having been given the same ability to drain auras that fuels the eternal life of the Kurians. He offers David a choice: join him in immortality or be shot. After a moment's hesitation, Valentine defiantly chooses death, but is saved moments from execution by Duvalier and Ahn-Kha. The General is killed by Valentine's Grog brother and the Twisted Cross is finished.

The book concludes with Valentine returning to the Ozarks to recuperate.

=== Tale of the Thunderbolt ===
Valentine is working undercover, deep in the Kurian Zone living as an officer in the Coastal Marines. Duvalier is supporting him and posing as his wife. Valentine's goal is to take a ship that can be sailed to the Caribbean, where Valentine is supposed to meet up with someone who has a weapon deadly to the Kurians.

Valentine convinces Lieutenant Post and a few other members of the Thunderbolt's crew to rebel along with Ahn-Kha and his Grogs, although it goes poorly when the captain of the ship learns of the planned mutiny before it is scheduled to occur. Valentine and his men take the weapons locker and engineering department but fail to convince the majority of the crew to rebel or take them by surprise. Valentine and his men are saved when Lieutenant Carrasca of Jamaica attacks and claims the Thunderbolt. After explaining his cause, Valentine is told that until Jamaica is free the Kurian controlling it.

Valentine kills this Kurian and is allowed to meet with Papa Legba in Haiti, the one who claimed to have the information needed to kill the Kurians, though he turns out to be a Kurian himself. Papa Legba shows him Quickwood, which can kill a Kurian or their Reapers almost instantly. Valentine then begins to transport the Quickwood back to the Ozarks, and in doing so begins a rebellion that soon envelopes all of Haiti.He finds out when he leaves that Carrasca is pregnant with his child but she thinks that the rebels need him more than she does.

The book concludes with an ambush in Texas that destroys much of the stock of Quickwood.

=== Valentine's Rising ===
The book begins with Valentine and his men learning of an invasion. Southern Command, once a bastion of freedom, has had its military strength broken and much of its territory overrun by a formidable army of soldiers borrowed from various Kurian Lords, all led by Consular Solon. Valentine encounters General Martinez, a Southern Command leader that hides away from fights, and acts like a mob warlord, and likely collaborates with the Kurians. Martinez orders Ahn-Kha's remaining two Grogs killed, which precipitates Valentine to draw his own firearm on Martinez. A Mexican standoff occurs, which ends with Martinez being tried for a court martial by Styachowski, an officer. In the end, the court martial falls apart as the armed men outside begin to mob the court. Valentine reaches an agreement with Martinez to allow himself, Styachowski, a team of Bears and roughly half of Martinez's regular forces to leave the camp.

Valentine and his men are unable to escape Solon's long-reaching grasp and choose instead to undertake a massive intelligence operation. They pose as a Quisling group sent to reinforce Solon's already impressive army. This leads to many tests of Valentine's faith as he is forced to make horrific decisions. He and his men are forced to work under Brigadier General Xray Tango and work for the betterment of the Kurian Order. Soon, Valentine and his men prove themselves to Solon and are granted access to arms and munitions.

The finale of the book comes as Valentine launches a crippling attack from within Fort Scott, taking and holding the area around it and completely halting Solon's forces and their ability to move while broadcasting a message to the scattered remnants of Southern Command, informing them that the mobility of Solon's forces was crippled and urging them to rise up and fight, which they do. Thus begins a long last stand effort as Valentine and his forces (now dubbed the "Razorbacks") hold the area and prevent Solon's forces from effectively countering the actions of Southern Command's forces elsewhere.

Valentine leads a team of Bears (including Styachowski, now dubbed "Wildcard") into the Kurian fortress to kill the Kurian Lords within, which they are mostly successful at doing. The book ends as forces from Texas come to reinforce Valentine and break him and his men free of the trap they'd willingly allowed to set around them. When a bewildered Valentine asks why the Texans would journey from another fort they were trapped in a siege to rescue him and his men, he is told: "That could wait. You couldn't. We remember the Alamo".

=== Valentine's Exile ===
Valentine's Exile begins with the Razorbacks as they continue to lay siege to the desperate remnants of Solon's forces. The Kurians attempt a breakout, which is stopped at great cost by the Razorbacks leaving William Post injured, but winning the day for the free territories.

Valentine is informed he has some time off and agrees to track down Post's wife. He learns that some women were given tests while Solon's forces occupied the Ozarks, and that Post's wife Gail was one of those who tested positive and was taken. While visiting Molly Carlson in an attempt to learn more about the tests, he is detained by Southern Command and informed that he is facing a court martial for the murder of Quisling prisoners.

While in detainment, Valentine learns that some Quislings are in the process of negotiating a truce, and that many of the more recent courts martial have been a way of showing the Quislings that Southern Command doesn't encourage murder and looting. Valentine is also offered a deal that will see him in prison for several years in exchange for a confession of guilt. He learns that the deal is false and instead escapes with the help of some sympathetic guards.

Valentine, free of the prison (though knowing he will be judged guilty in absentia), decides to continue his search for Gail Post. This takes him to meet Eveready, who helps him with supplies, and allows Valentine to infiltrate the Kurian facility where Gail Post is being held. After spending weeks in the facility, Valentine is able to escape with a pregnant Gail, though it requires Ahn-Kha to draw off their pursuit.

The child is delivered, and everyone is horrified to discover that Gail has given birth to a Reaper. The book ends as Valentine wonders whether the newborn creature has a soul, or if it's already a mindless killing machine.

=== Valentine's Resolve ===
Valentine's Resolve is set a few years after Valentine's Exile. Valentine has abandoned the cause, and is exacting revenge on the rape and murder of one of the Carlson girls whom he met in Way of the Wolf. At this point, Valentine is a loner scratching out an existence in the borderlands. A group of Southern Command Cats track him down and recruit him for a special mission. Even though Southern Command has faced several victories in the years since the Counter Attack and the alliance with the Texas freehold, the lack of Lifeweavers is making the situation precarious. The Lifeweavers who were previously allied with the free territories were either all captured or killed, and have yet to return to the Ozarks. Valentine is charged with a mission to seek out remaining Lifeweavers and to entice them into coming to the Ozarks. Valentine reluctantly accepts the mission after the Cats use his "son", a Reaper born to William Post's wife Gail, Blake as leverage. He then enlists in another of the free territories, Pacific Command, where he finds out that their success is due to killing the Seattle Kurian's population (therefore denying the Kurian their auras). When he deserts and goes against Pacific Command, he ends up joining the "Quislings" and killing Pacific Command's leader, who turns out to be a Lifeweaver/Kurian. After this is completed the rest of Pacific Command joins him and he succeeds in subduing one of the biggest "Vampires" on the west coast, Seattle, as well as rescuing a number of lifeweavers.

=== Fall With Honor ===
Valentine is again residing within Southern command as a teacher and laborer at a remote outpost. He is recruited by Dots Lambert (now a colonel) to start up a unit of men and women that were born and lived in the Kurian Zone. Without enough volunteers, he enlists ex-Quislings. The unit is to be part of an expedition to start a new freehold in the Appalachian mountains, dangerously close to the Kurian strongholds on the Atlantic seaboard. Valentine, and the top brass organizing the project, are also motivated by the rumors of a resistance that is having success in the region and is led by a golden Grog.

The invasion starts out well. The expedition wins battles as they move through Kentucky and allies with several Legworm clans. However, when they meet up with the resistance, the meeting turns out to be a Quisling ruse and the expedition's leadership is ambushed in the middle of a feast. Southern Command is forced to retreat with supposedly elite Quisling troops (the Moondaggers) following close behind. Valentine eventually becomes second in command and continues to beat the enemy even though Southern command is always outnumbered and in a constant state of retreat. They are eventually pinned down across from Evansville, IN, on the Ohio River. A general uprising in Evansville and throughout Kentucky sparks the attacking spirit in Southern Command soldiers and the remnants of the Legworm Clans. They make a final charge at the enemy lines and win the day. For now.

=== Winter Duty ===
Southern Command has a new president, uninterested in holding the Evansville and Kentucky territory gained in the last book. Valentine organizes his own forces of former Quislings to provide support when the official troops march off. Almost immediately, a large group of Reapers takes over the Evansville power plant, but, with significant help from Duvalier and a squad of Bears, Valentine is able to kill the Kurian controlling them from the Owensboro bridge and retake the city. A convention of Kentucky clan leaders is interrupted by a bomb planted inside a legworm, tipping the scales in favor of opposition to the Kurians. Valentine worries that his own side planted the bomb to achieve just this result. Valentine is then ordered to accompany wealthy cattle baron Bethany O'Coombe to look for her son, MIA in the long retreat across Kentucky. Along the way, one of the new avian-type Reapers warns the group that if Kentucky does not remain neutral, Kurian forces will exact a terrible retribution. They catch up to O'Coombe's son at a meeting of Kentucky clans, where he is providing what appears to be inept artillery advice; when this meeting is attacked by Kurian forces, it turns out this was a ruse to draw the Kurians into a devastating ambush. As Valentine returns to Evansville with the O'Coombes, a terrible snowstorm slows their progress, and they are attacked by a vicious strain of Ravies (zombies), called Woolies for the excessive hair growth of its victims. He captures a musical armored car, which is able to soothe or enrage the Ravies, and uses it to turn the Ravies on their Kurian creators. He is horrified to discover that his protege Frat is a Kurian agent, and has been travelling with them to spread the Woolly virus. Despite his obvious crimes, Valentine can't bring himself to execute Frat, and grants him amnesty.

=== March in Country ===
The national best-selling "master of deception and tension" (Black Gate) returns to the Vampire Earth. The race is on to claim the area between the Ohio River and Tennessee. What's left of the resistance is hiding out in the tangle of central Kentucky hills - leaving the powerful, well-organized Kurian's the opportunity to fill the void.

Major David Valentine knows there's only one way for them to find help before the Kurians settle in: a desperate dash by hijacked rail, followed by a harrowing river journey.

Valentine unites friends old and new in the effort - but the Kurian Order won't easily yield the blood-soaked Kentucky soil.

=== Appalachian Overthrow ===
The 10th book in the series, Appalachian Overthrow, focuses on Ahn-Kha's activities that were taking place at more-or-less the same time as the previous four novels, as it starts by reviewing escape and getaway chase from Xanadu. The Roc Hardcover first edition was released on April 2, 2013.

=== Baltic Gambit ===
While out scouting in southern Indiana, Alessa Duvalier comes across a Kurian Conference being attended by every major military sect the Kurians have in the Midwest. Taking advantage of the strategic opportunity to cripple their enemy, Alessa and her warriors strike and achieve victory—only to discover an even greater threat to humanity.

Most of the world's resistance leaders and the Lifeweavers are gathering for a peace conference in Helsinki, Finland, and according to the intelligence materials Alessa recovered during her raid, the Kurians have already inserted an agent among the delegates.

Valentine is chosen to be head of security for the Army of Kentucky representatives—and Alessa ignores his order to stay behind. Thrust into a lethal intrigue that threatens the entire peace process, she learns that the Kurian agent may be the least of her concerns.

== Awards ==
Way of the Wolf

- 2004 Compton Crook Award (Baltimore Science Fiction Society)
- 2004 Darrell Award (Memphis Science Fiction Association)
