= Stone and Sky (Edwards novel) =

1999 novel written by Graham Edwards

- Author: Graham Edwards
- Cover artist: Les Edwards
- Language: English
- Genre: Fantasy
- Publisher: Voyager Books
- Publication date: June 1999
- Publication place: United Kingdom
- Media type: Print (Hardback & Paperback)
- Pages: 357 pp
- ISBN: 0-00-651070-1
- OCLC: 45444063
- Followed by: Stone and Sea

Stone and Sky is a fantasy novel written by Graham Edwards. The novel was first published in 1999 by Voyager Books (UK) and HarperPrism (US). It is the first book in the Stone trilogy, which also includes Stone and Sea and Stone and Sun. The trilogy is a follow-up to Edwards' Ultimate Dragon Saga trilogy, and is loosely connected via various plot threads.

== Plot summary ==
The book, as well as its sequels, follows the adventures of British historian and naturalist Jonah Lightfoot, who is caught in the eruption of Krakatoa in 1883. The blast transports him and American runaway Annie West into a vertical world consisting of a seemingly infinite wall populated by crumbling civilisations, weird creatures, and sentient dragons. No one knows where the wall begins or ends, and no one dares to climb to its top or fall to its base.

This world is called Amara, and it is a place deeply entwined with our own world. Throughout the books Jonah and his companions traverse the world and uncover its many mysteries. The true nature of Amara is fully revealed in the second book of the trilogy, Stone and Sea.

== List of major characters ==
- Jonah Lightfoot - A British historian and naturalist from the Victorian era, and a follower of Charles Darwin.
- Annie West - An American painter from Jonah's time, escaping from an abusive husband when she meets Jonah near Java.
- Archan - The immortal, evil dragon, first seen in Dragonstorm.
- Ocher - One of the Deathless, once an immortal basilisk.
- Gerent - A pre-Homo sapiens human, born on Amara.
- Malya - A pre-Homo sapiens human, born on Amara.
- Kythe - A dragon, born on Amara.
- Esh - A strange sentient bug-like creature whose task it is to rebuild decaying parts of Amara.
- Frey - A witch doctor seeking to own magical powers, born on Amara.
- Torus - A dragon of Amara, tortured to insanity by Frey in his search for magic's essence.
- Rance West - Annie's husband, a violent farm-owner.
