= Bard's Oath =

- First edition
- Author: Joanne Bertin
- Cover artist: Bob Eggleton
- Language: English
- Series: Dragonlord
- Genre: Fantasy
- Publisher: Tor Fantasy
- Publication date: 2012
- Publication place: United States
- Media type: Print (hardback & paperback), digital
- Preceded by: Dragon and Phoenix

Bard's Oath is the third in the Dragonlord series by Joanne Bertin and was published in 2012. It takes place in a world of truehumans, truedragons, and dragonlords - beings which have both human and dragon souls and can change from human to dragon and vice versa at will. It was preceded by the short story Dragonlord's Justice, The Last Dragonlord and Dragon and Phoenix.

== Plot introduction ==
The book covers the story of Raven Redhawkson and Bard Leet separately on their journeys that converge at the Balyaranna Fair - the finest horse festival in the Five Kingdoms. Raven is there as a partner to his aunt's horse trade, while Bard Leet is there to avenge the death of a family member. Also visiting the Fair are Raven's Dragonlord friends: Maurynna Kyrissean, her soultwin Linden Rathan, and the newest Dragonlord, Shima Ilyathan. When one of Shima's new acquaintances reveals a particularly nasty secret about one of the Fair's other attendees, events begin to spiral out of control, as Leet's thirst for vengeance becomes a burning hunger with a surprising target.

Meanwhile, far away in the wilderness, a Beast Healer friend of Linden's stumbles upon a long-forgotten horror, the truth of which could restore peace to the Balyaranna Fair... or drown it in blood.
