= Skallagrigg =

1987 novel by William Horwood

- First edition
- Author: William Horwood
- Cover artist: David Kearney
- Language: English
- Publisher: Viking Press
- Publication date: 1987
- Publication place: United Kingdom
- Media type: Print
- Pages: 576
- ISBN: 0-670-80132-1

Skallagrigg is a 1987 novel written by William Horwood and influenced by Horwood's relationship with his own daughter Rachel, who has cerebral palsy. It is notable in that it foresaw the importance of adaptive computer technology in the lives of future generations of disabled people. It is also an early example of discourse on disability politics, treatment of disabled people throughout history, and hit-or-miss relations and perceptions between disabled and non-disabled communities.

== Plot ==
Arthur Lane is a young boy with profound cerebral palsy, who is unable to walk, talk, feed himself, or sit unsupported. He is abandoned in a grim hospital in the north of England in 1921, at the age of seven. His family believe they are sending him to a specialised facility for the good of all, where they will have the equipment and expertise to give him a better life. In reality he is subject to extreme cruelty and neglect. Through his decades-long ordeal, his faith in the 'Skallagrigg' – a special being with a keen empathy for people with his disabilities – sustains him, and stories grow up about Arthur and the Skallagrigg.

Half a century later comes Esther – a keenly intelligent teenager who also has cerebral palsy, but whose talents are recognised in a more enlightened age. Her mother died at her birth due to a fatal car accident, and as a result, Esther was delivered prematurely by caesarian section – which is implied to have possibly contributed to her condition. Since her father, Richard, is unable to cope with her condition and the loss of her mother, Esther is bounced between multiple foster parents – who struggle to cope with her profoundly demanding and unique medical needs – before winding up at a home for disabled children called the Dale Centre. There she meets Peter Rowne – an even more disabled, even more intelligent boy slightly older than her, Karen – a severely learning-disabled 'frienemy', and Tom – a docile and courageous, though sometimes invasive young boy with Down syndrome, who becomes her lifelong ally and protector.

At the age of eleven, Esther takes up residence with her father, and finally manages to communicate her intelligence to him with Tom's help (specialists had emphatically cautioned her father and non-disabled carers not to see intelligence that wasn't there). She is subsequently sent off to Netherton – an adapted school for highly gifted disabled students. Having squandered her first term, the death of Peter Rowne from pneumonia, and her recently reconnected Grandmother's firm words, inspire a reformation in her, and she does exceptionally well. There she ponders the life questions every teenager does – love, marriage, sex, friendships, jobs, future living, but with the added fear and uncertainty of her disability. She also learns about the terrible conditions disabled people have had to endure, both in the past and in her lifetime. Through all of this she grows up with the myth of the Skallagrigg, and the secret stories told among the disabled community through non-verbal language. She eventually realises that these stories are real, told by a real person and describing a real place. Piecing them together with the help of her friends and family, she eventually discovers Arthur, the true identity of the Skallagrigg, the characters in the story, and the fact that Arthur has an estranged son and grandson, reuniting Arthur with his beloved Skallagrigg.

Following this, Esther becomes interested in writing computer games, and carries on written conversation with Daniel, an American computer graphics genius. Together they develop first a friendship, then, when he comes to England, a relationship which develops into a marriage. Meanwhile, Esther obsessively works on writing a computer game based on her experiences finding the Skallagrigg, her sense that Arthur's grandson should have the chance to discover his family (despite Arthur's belief that it would be better for him not to know what his grandfather was), and her own anguish at not being able to do more for Daniel, and for their infant child, due to her severe disabilities. The work, giving birth, and the relentless frustration and upset, take a heavy toll on her mental and physical health, which is exacerbated by frailty caused by her cerebral palsy – but she remains surrounded by love and purpose throughout.

The story ends with Arthur's son and grandson, Esther's granddaughter, father, husband and son, and Tom, all reuniting and reconciling – having been torn apart by Esther's death and by Richard's marriage to Kate and subsequent emigration to Australia.

== Screen adaptation ==
Skallagrigg was shown on BBC2's Screen Two in 1994 with screenplay by Nigel Williams and won a BAFTA for Best Single Drama in 1995. It starred Bernard Hill, John McArdle, Richard Briers, Nick Brimble, Kerry Noble and Ian Dury. Its screenplay and plot are a dramatically abridged version of the original book, and all the characters have far milder disabilities than those in the book. A teenage Esther has been living in the Dale Centre where Tom and Raj (Peter from the book) also reside. Her estranged father has been failing to sell sports equipment overseas. Esther, meanwhile, has been trying to discover the identity of Arthur and the Skallagrigg, and enlists her father's help. At first her father is quite clueless as to how to cope with her disability, and she is upset with him for having abandoned her in favour of an easier, less restricted life. However, as their search takes them across the country, their bond grows and they become closer and more protective of each other. They manage to rescue Arthur from abusive care and reunite him with the "Skallagrigg". The story ends with Esther's father carrying her upstairs to bed, whereas he had left her to crawl up on her own at the start. The plot threads concerning Daniel, Arthur's family, the computer game, and Esther's extended family, are all left out.

== Reviews ==
- G.M. The Independent Fantasy Roleplaying Magazine #2
