= Joanne Bertin =

American writer

- Born: January 1, 1953 (age 73); New York City, U.S.
- Occupations: Author, librarian
- Writing career
- Genre: Fantasy
- Website: www.lastdragonlord.com

Joanne Bertin (born January 1, 1953) is an American writer of science fiction and fantasy novels and short stories that feature dragons as a recurring motif.

== Early life ==
Joanne Bertin was born in 1953 in Manhattan. She lived there only briefly, as her family returned to their home in Stamford, Connecticut. Bertin lived most of her life in various towns in Connecticut.

== Career ==
Bertin held a variety of jobs including factory worker, coloring comic books when the color separation was done by hand, and working as an assistant goatherd on a dairy farm. At the time of writing the FAQ page for her now-defunct website, she had worked for twenty years in libraries. She does not make a living from writing, but pursues it because of personal pleasure and a desire to entertain others. However, her ambition is to quit her day job and move to writing full-time.

Bertin's first publication was in 1995 when her short story Dragonlord's Justice was submitted for an anthology of dragon stories and accepted. Her first novel, The Last Dragonlord was published in 1998. The sequel, Dragon and Phoenix, was published the following year. The last book in the trilogy, Bard's Oath, was released on November 27, 2012.

== Dragonlord series ==
- Dragonlord's Justice (Short Story) (1995)
- The Last Dragonlord (1998)
- Dragon and Phoenix (1999)
- Bard's Oath (November 2012)
