= Sione Katoa =

Sione Katoa may refer to:

- Sione Katoa (rugby league, born 1995), Tongan rugby league player for Penrith and the Bulldogs
- Sione Katoa (rugby league, born 1997), New Zealand rugby league player for Cronulla
