= The Last Dragonlord =

1998 fantasy novel by Joanne Bertin

- First edition
- Author: Joanne Bertin
- Cover artist: Bob Eggleton
- Language: English
- Series: Dragonlord
- Genre: Fantasy novel
- Publisher: Tor Fantasy
- Publication date: 1998
- Publication place: United States
- Media type: Print (Hardback & Paperback)
- Pages: 471
- ISBN: 0-8125-4541-9
- OCLC: 42377977
- Followed by: Dragon and Phoenix

The Last Dragonlord is the first in a series of books written by Joanne Bertin. It takes place in a world of truehumans, truedragons, and dragonlords - beings that have both human and dragon souls and can change from human to dragon and vice versa at will.

The Last Dragonlord refers to a central character of the book, Linden Rathan, so called because he is the last dragonlord to have been born in more than 600 years. He is also the only dragonlord without a soultwin, who is another dragonlord with the other half of his dragon and human souls.

The Last Dragonlord was published in 1998. It was followed by two sequels, Dragon and Phoenix in 1999 and Bard's Oath in 2012.

== Plot introduction ==
The Dragonlords watch over the Five Kingdoms, serving as impartial juries in disputes between kingdoms or involving high ranking nobles as they are seen as above the common interests due to their extremely long lives. When the Queen of Cassori dies in suspicious circumstances, leaving behind only a young son as her heir, Linden and the two other dragonlords are called in to investigate, and prevent a civil war as two rival human nobles vie for the regency. As the court infighting escalates, Linden becomes a target of the Fellowship, a secret society of humans who feel that dragonlords should stay out of human politics and who are willing to use black magic to kill the dragonlords if necessary to get their way. Linden is helped in his investigation by his old friend, Bard Otter, and by the ship captain he meets through him, Maurynna, who may be the only one who can help Linden bring Cassori back from the brink of civil war.
