= Robert Don Hughes =

American novelist

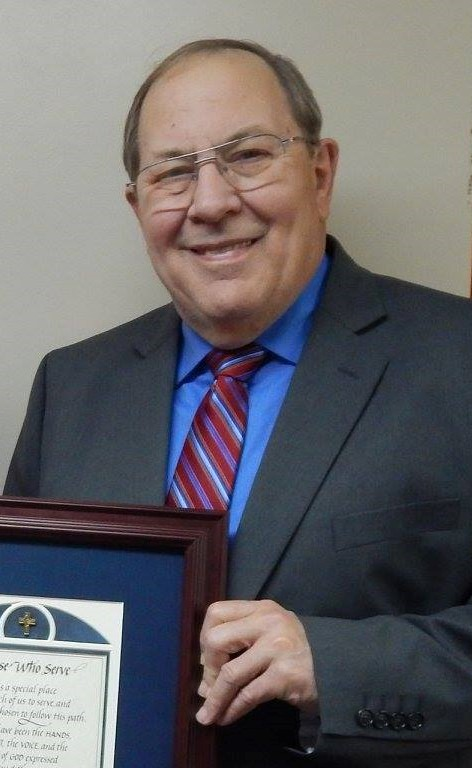
- Hughes in 2019 after his last service as Pastor.
- Born: November 14, 1949; Ventura, California, U.S.
- Died: November 23, 2023 (aged 74); Guthrie, Oklahoma, U.S.
- Occupations: Author and pastor
- Writing career
- Genres: Fantasy, science fiction, non-fiction

Dr. Robert Don Hughes (Nov. 14,1949 - Nov. 23, 2023) was an American educator, writer, and pastor. He authored mainstream fantasy and science fiction and evangelical non-fiction.

== Early life and education ==
Hughes was born in Ventura, California, one of at least three children of Robert Dale and Ruth Naomi Hughes. He played football in high school. He married Teresia Gail Smith, daughter of Heflin and Geraldine Smith. The Hugheses had one daughter, Bronwynn, born in Nigeria, where they were then missionaries.

Hughes attended the University of Redlands, received his B.A. from California Baptist College, his M.Div. from Golden Gate Baptist Theological Seminary, and his Ph.D. from the Southern Baptist Theological Seminary. At California Baptist College he began the "Drama Trio."

== Professional career and later life ==
After graduation, Hughes was employed at the Southern Baptist Theological Seminary in Louisville, Kentucky, as associate vice president of external programs and Associate Professor of Communications and Mass Media. Later he was a professor of missions and evangelism at Clear Creek Baptist Bible College in Pineville, Kentucky. He also taught at the University of the Cumberlands in Williamsburg, Kentucky for a time, served as a Youth Pastor, and Journeyman to Zambia, and from 1980 to 1984, a missionary in Nigeria. His last pastorate was East Jellico Missionary Baptist Church in Pineville. He retired from pastoral ministry in 2019.

After retirement, Hughes moved to Guthrie, Oklahoma, in order to be closer to his sister Peggy. He died in Guthrie in 2023, predeceased by his wife Gail and brother John. He was survived by his daughter Bronwynn and sister Peggy.

== Literary career ==
Hughes was a writer of secular fantasy and science fiction, as well as religious fiction and non-fiction. All of his writings tend to deal seriously with religious themes. His most extended body of work consists of his two fantasy sequences about a magical country split into three states after a two-headed dragon occupies the main route linking them. As a result, the magical potential of each region develops in different directions. His "Pelman the Powershaper" trilogy tells of the end of the dragon's reign and its consequences, while the unfinished "Wizard and Dragon" sequence, also projected as a trilogy, deals with how the dragon was originally created. The powerfully imagined dragon Vicia-Heinox with its two bickering heads set a pattern for the portrayal of similar creatures in other media, including the animated film Quest for Camelot (1998) and the public television children's program Dragon Tales (1999–2005).

Hughes's science fiction is more overtly religious, consisting of the novels The Fallen and its sequel The Eternity Gene, and the singleton Gabriel's Trumpet. His religious non-fiction includes Talking to the World in the Days to Come (on missions) and Satan's Whispers, which has the distinction of having been adopted for use by the Billy Graham Evangelistic Association in the early 1990s.

Hughes also wrote plays for churches. He was a filmmaker while serving overseas in Africa.

== Bibliography ==
=== Fantasy ===
==== Pelmen the Powershaper ====
1. The Prophet of Lamath (1979)
2. The Wizard in Waiting (1982)
3. The Power and the Prophet (1985)

==== Wizard and Dragon ====
1. The Forging of the Dragon (1989)
2. The Faithful Traitor (1992)

==== Short fiction ====
- "Pursuit of a Lost Tugolith: A Tale of Pelmen Before the Dragon Was Divided" (1983)
- "Dragon Meat" (1987)

=== Science fiction ===
==== The Fallen ====
- The Fallen: A Novel (1995)
- The Eternity Gene (1999)

==== Other ====
- Gabriel's Trumpet (1993)

=== Non-fiction ===
- Plays That'll Preach (1985)
- A Real Live Missionary (1990)
- Talking to the World in the Days to Come (1991)
- Satan's Whispers: Breaking the Lies That Bind (1992)
- Questioning God (2002)
- History: Think for Yourself About What Shaped the Church (2008)
