= Dragon and Phoenix =

Second book in the Dragonlord series

- Author: Joanne Bertin
- Cover artist: Bob Eggleton
- Language: English
- Series: Dragonlord
- Genre: Fantasy novel
- Publisher: Tor Fantasy
- Publication date: 1999
- Publication place: United States
- Media type: Print (Hardback & Paperback)
- Pages: 398 pg
- ISBN: 0-312-86429-9
- OCLC: 38964253
- Dewey Decimal: 813/.54 21
- LC Class: PS3552.E7745 L3 1998
- Preceded by: The Last Dragonlord
- Followed by: Bard's Oath

Dragon and Phoenix is the second of the Dragonlord series by Joanne Bertin and was published in 1999. It takes place in a world of truehumans, truedragons, and dragonlords - beings which have both human and dragon souls and can change from human to dragon and vice versa at will. It was preceded by the short story Dragonlord's Justice, The Last Dragonlord, and is followed by Bard's Oath.

== Plot introduction ==
Dragonlord Linden Rathan and his wife, Maurynna Kyrissean are trying to enjoy the life of newlyweds when a traveller brings a shocking tale to Dragonskeep: the empire of Jehanglan, far to the south, is sustained through the power of a phoenix, bound by the magical power of a truedragon, also trapped and exploited. Learning they must act before the phoenix is due to die and be reborn, Linden, Maurynna, and their mortal and immortal friends launch a daring rescue operation to the reclusive Phoenix Empire.

Meanwhile, in the halls of Jehanglan's imperial palace, a power struggle erupts between Shei-Luin, the emperor's favorite concubine, and Jhanun, the most conservative of the Jehangli nobles. The emperor himself meanwhile, finds himself increasingly swayed into believing the heresies of Shei-Luin's estranged and exiled father: the history of Jehanglan is a lie, and phoenix must be freed.
