= Daniel Hood =

American writer of fantasy novels

Daniel Hood is an American writer of fantasy novels.

He was born in Pelham, a small town just north of the Bronx. He wrote his first book in 1991, which was published in 1994.

== Bibliography ==
=== Fanuilh series ===
These are mostly mysteries in a fantasy setting, in which the main character, Liam Rhenford, is assisted by the dragon Fanuilh, formerly the familiar of the wizard who was the murder victim in his first "case".

1. Fanuilh (1994, ISBN 0-441-00055-X )
  When the wizard Tarquin is killed in his bed, there are only two mourners—his miniature dragon familiar, Fanuilh, and his friend, scholar Liam Rhenford. Liam isn't about to get involved until Fanuilh magically bonds with him. Compelled by the dragon's desire for justice, Liam learns magic—but will it be enough to save Fanuilh?
2. Wizard's Heir (1995, ISBN 0-441-00231-5 )
  Inheriting a wizard's familiar but not the ability to master any magical abilities, Liam instead employs his growing detective skills when his late friend's magical artifacts are stolen and used to commit crime.
3. Beggar's Banquet (1997, ISBN 0-441-00434-2 )
  Liam Rhenford never claimed to be a wizard, though he possesses a dragon familiar. He never claimed to be a detective, though he's had success solving crimes. Nevertheless, he agrees to help solve the theft of a priceless and magical family heirloom stolen from his business partner. And he recruits his dragon familiar, Fanuilh, to help. Because what's a little magic among friends?
4. Scales of Justice (1998, ISBN 0-441-00515-2 )
  Investigator Liam Rhenford and his dragon are back in their fourth case. When a dead wizard turns up, all the evidence points to an even more powerful wizard. Or is something completely different going on?
5. King's Cure (2000, ISBN 0-441-00789-9 )
  Liam Rhenford has traveled to the royal capital of Torquay to investigate new trade routes for the Duke. But he hasn't been told his true mission: to deliver a magical remedy to King Nicanor IV. That's why Liam is surprised when he discovers people will kill to get their hands on the package he's carrying. And when someone is murdered, Liam is blamed.

=== Other ===
- New York: The Unknown City (with Brad Dunn)
