= Sioned =

Sioned is a Welsh feminine given name and a variant of Janet. It may refer to:

- Sioned Harries (born 1989), Welsh rugby union player
- Sioned James (1974–2016), Welsh musician and choir conductor
- Sioned Wiliam (born 1962), Welsh comedy producer and executive
- Sioned Williams, Welsh politician

== In fiction ==
- Sioned the Sunrunner, a main character from Melanie Raun's Dragon Prince and Dragon Star trilogies
- Protagonist and narrator of the novel Sioned by Sarah Winifred Parry (1870–1953)

== See also ==
- Sione, an unrelated Oceanic-origin name with a similar spelling
- Janet (given name)
