= E. E. Knight =

American novelist

- Born: March 7, 1965 (age 61); La Crosse, Wisconsin, U.S.
- Occupations: Writer, instructor
- Writing career
- Period: 2003–present
- Genres: Science fiction, Fantasy
- Notable works: Vampire Earth; Age of Fire
- Notable awards: Compton Crook Award; 2004 Way of the Wolf – Novel Darrell Award Winner for Best Novel; 2004 Way of the Wolf – Novel Dal Coger Memorial Hall of Fame; 2007 Valentine's Exile – Novel

E. E. Knight (born March 7, 1965) is the pen name for American science fiction and fantasy writer Eric Frisch, born in La Crosse, Wisconsin. He grew up in Stillwater, Minnesota and resides in Oak Park, Illinois, with his wife and children.

In May 2007, he donated his archive to the department of Rare Books and Special Collections at Northern Illinois University.

== Series ==
=== Vampire Earth ===
In the Vampire Earth series, aliens from a world known as Kur have taken over the world, destroying human society and enslaving the survivors. The novels follow the life of David Valentine, a young man who enlists with Southern Command, one of the few remnants of the old U.S. government scattered around, as he follows his heart even when it conflicts with orders.

=== Age of Fire ===
The Age of Fire series takes place in a world where dragons exist, but are becoming extinct. Civilization is under attack by barbarians from the north. Each of the first three novels in the series follows the life of one of three dragon siblings from fireless hatchlings to soaring dragons. The next three books follow the dragon siblings as they attempt to bring dragons back to the world.

=== Dragoneer Academy ===
The Dragoneer Academy series is a subsequent series that takes place in the same world as Age of Fire, years later. In the Dragoneer Academy a young girl, Ileth, applies to become a Novice in the Serpentine Academy in order to become a Dragon Rider. There she meets a very old dragon who, while not explicitly revealed by name, is very likely DharSii from the Age of Fire series.

== Bibliography ==
=== Vampire Earth series ===
- Way of the Wolf (2003)
- Choice of the Cat (2004)
- Tale of the Thunderbolt (2005)
- Valentine's Rising (2005)
- Valentine's Exile (2006)
- Valentine's Resolve (2007)
- Fall With Honor (2008)
- Winter Duty (2009)
- March in Country (2011)
- Appalachian Overthrow (2013)
- Baltic Gambit (2014)

=== Age of Fire series ===
- Dragon Champion (2005)
- Dragon Avenger (2006)
- Dragon Outcast (2007)
- Dragon Strike (2008)
- Dragon Rule (2009)
- Dragon Fate (2011)

=== Dragoneer Academy series ===
- Novice Dragoneer (2019)
- Daughter of the Serpentine (2020)

=== Standalone Novels ===
- Lara Croft Tomb Raider: The Lost Cult (2004)

== Awards ==
- Way of the Wolf (2004) Compton Crook Award, Novel
- Way of the Wolf (2004) Darrell, Novel
- Valentine's Exile (2007) Dal Coger Memorial Hall of Fame, Novel

== Interviews ==
- Interview with E.E. Knight at FlamesRising.com. (May 2006)
- Interview with E.E. Knight at SFFWorld.com. (May 2005)
- EE Knight Talks Dragons and EE Knight Interview at Bookspotcentral.com
- Interview with E. E. Knight at Lili's Lair. (July 2009)
- Questions and Answers with E. E. Knight at Hortorian.com. (May 2011)
