= Age of Fire =

Novel series by E. E. Knight

- Cover from Dragon Champion
- Dragon Champion; Dragon Avenger; Dragon Outcast; Dragon Strike; Dragon Rule; Dragon Fate
- Author: E. E. Knight
- Cover artist: Paul Youll
- Country: United States
- Language: English
- Genre: Fantasy, adventure
- Publisher: Roc Books
- Published: 2005–2011
- Media type: Paperback
- Preceded by: Vampire Earth

Age of Fire is a series of fantasy adventure novels written by E. E. Knight, who is also known for writing the Vampire Earth series. Age of Fire is eventually succeeded by the Dragoneer Academy Series, a spin-off of Age of Fire.

== Plot ==
The series follows the adventures of three dragon siblings. All having hatched from a clutch of five eggs carefully protected by the female dragon Irelia and her mate, bronze AuRel, the young dragons quickly establish themselves into distinct roles. Upon hatching, the males of the clutch are instinctively driven to fight each other to the death, which leads to the death of a Red hatchling, while the Copper suffers a crippled leg and must live as an outcast, leaving grey Auron to dwell with his two sisters under the protection of their parents. All four hatchlings survive their first seasons in the cavern, until an attack on their home cave results in the deaths of their mother and the female hatchling Jizara. Auron and Wistala escape into the Upper World, while the crippled Copper eventually makes his way deeper below ground. In the fantasy setting of the novels, dragon population has been dwindling as relations among the many races worsen. Humans especially are becoming the dominant species, but there are still powerful factions of dwarves, elves and other sentient species.

The first three books are written from a different sibling's point of view and occur simultaneously. They are stand-alone novels that are accessible without having read the other two.

=== Dragon Champion (Book 1) ===
- Perspective: AuRon

Dragon Champion follows AuRon (Auron), the youngest male and clutchwinner. After being separated from Wistala, he is captured and sold to humans buying dragon hatchlings. He escapes and sets forth to seek the dragon NooMoahk because of a rumour that the ancient black knows the secret of dragonkind's supposed fatal weakness. Along the way he encounters many friends and future allies, the Dawn Roarer wolf pack, the tradesdwarf Djer, Naf the mercenary and the girl-child Hieba. AuRon studies under NooMoahk for a time and then comes to rule a small kingdom of the local blighters after the latter's death. However, the blighter ruler he had installed is killed by rivals who wish to lead all blighters to war with the humans. AuRon comes to learn of the Wyrmmaster who believes in human supremacy and wishes to wipe out the other races. The blighter war was instigated by him to destroy the other races. The Wyrmmaster is so named because he uses dragons to fight his wars; it was to him AuRon would have been sold to as a hatchling. AuRon volunteers and infiltrates to serve the Wyrmmaster and finds the "fatal" weakness of dragons: the fact that they imprint upon the first creature they see upon hatching and can then be tamed. With the help of the female dragons AuRon leads a successful uprising against the Wyrmmaster. AuRon mates with Natasatch and hopes to raise his children so that the males do not kill each other upon hatching, ending the book.

=== Dragon Avenger (Book 2) ===
- Perspective: Wistala

Dragon Avenger follows Wistala, the sole surviving female. After being separated from Auron, she tracks down their gravely-injured father and spends some weeks nursing him back to health. However, Wistala and AuRel are found by the dragon hunter Drakossozh, and after her father is killed she is forced to leap into a gorge to escape. She is rescued, unconscious and near death, by a kindhearted elf named Rainfall who becomes an adoptive father to the orphan. During her stay with Rainfall, Wistala becomes involved in a conspiracy by the local thane Hammar to claim Mossbell, Rainfall's ancestral home. She later travels with a circus as a fortune teller, briefly roaming the land after uncasing her wings in search of dragons who can help her avenge her family's deaths. After an unsuccessful meeting with a small group of ambivalent dragons in the north, Wistala returns to the circus and wins favor with a dwarf named Gobold Fangbreaker, the ruler of the Wheel of Fire and the same dwarf responsible for the murder of her parents. Wistala manipulates his downfall from a position of trust, instigating a war between the dwarves and the human barbarians of the north and sabotaging the dwarves, leading to the downfall of the stronghold. Wistala slays Gobold and later encounters the Dragonblade, who agrees to end the bloodshed between their families. The book ends with Wistala preparing to leave in search of AuRon, who she finds is still alive.

Dragon Avenger spans the least amount of time of the first three books, following Wistala's first 14 years or so.

=== Dragon Outcast (Book 3) ===
- Perspective: the Copper (RuGaard)

Dragon Outcast follows the copper as he explores the lower world. Meeting with blood-sucking bats and dwarves, he makes his way to a community of dragons in the Lavadome, where he is adopted into the imperial family by the current ruler, the Tyr, and named RuGaard. RuGaard deals with politics and hominids, and searches for his place in a world of treachery and war. During his stay in the Lavadome, he becomes the owner of the human thrall Rayg, the lost great-grandson of Wistala's adopted elf father. He is later forced to mate with the sickly dragonelle Halaflora by the Tyr's mate. Not long after the Tyr dies and his brother-in-law SiDrakkon becomes Tyr. Rayg succeeds in crafting a brace for the wing that Drakossozh crippled in RuGaard's infancy, enabling the Copper to fly. Emissaries of the Wyrmmaster arrive and attack the Copper's home of Anaea, shortly after SiDrakkon dies under mysterious circumstances and his nephew SiMelovant becomes Tyr and arranges peace with the invaders. After the accidental death of Halaflora, RuGaard leads a successful assault against invading dragonriders and kills the Dragonblade, Drakossozh as well as SiMelovant. With the victory, RuGaard is named Tyr (king) of the Lavadome dragons, with his drakehood love Nilrasha as his mate.

Nearly all of Dragon Outcast takes place in the lower world.

=== Dragon Strike (Book 4) ===
- Perspective: AuRon, Wistala and the Copper (RuGaard)

Dragon Strike is the fourth book, but the sequel to the first three concurrent books. Despite victory over the Demen, RuGaard's Tyrship is threatened when a plague from blighted kern sweeps through Lavadome, killing hatchlings and the eldest dragons. He considers alliance with either Hypatia or Ghioz. Wistala sets off to find AuRon, and takes up with the Blighters in his old cave, both made more clever and more fearful by the magical gem Sunshard she finds there. The caves are attacked by Ghiozi forces; she defeats two dragons, defectors from the Lavadome, but breaks a wing and falls down a deep well during a fight with DharSii, an attractive warrior dragon she met in Book 2. Deep below ground, Wistala is captured by Demen refugees under Pastinix; despite poor treatment, when she is rescued by Firemaidens she helps Pastinix escape and promises to speak on their behalf with the Tyr of the Lavadome. Meanwhile, AuRon hears of Wistala from treasure hunters, and leaves the Isle of Ice to find her and gold for his hatchlings. He meets her friends, then DharSii, both of whom recommend hiring himself to the Red Queen of Ghioz. This many-masked, clever, and powerful woman gives him an amulet and sends him to negotiate an alliance with the Lavadome dragons. While searching for an entrance, he sees Naf's forces being firebombed by Ghiozi roc riders. Landing to help put out the flames, he is disturbed by stories of his employer's cruelty.

DharSii, AuRon, and Wistala all arrive in time for the same meeting in the Lavadome. DharSii warns of a massive force of Ironrider mercenaries and warriors of Ghioz, AuRon is taken over by the magical amulet and threatens the Lavadome before attacking his brother Tyr RuGaard, and Wistala—now a member of the Firemaidens—pins him and breaks the amulet from his neck. RuGaard, having received confirmation from his bat spies that the kern was deliberately poisoned by the Ghioz, asks Wistala to negotiate an alliance with Hypatia and declares war on Ghioz.

The siblings again separate. AuRon helps Naf defeat a group of Ironriders, then leads them against Ghioz. RuGaard recaptures Pastinix, and with his help, leads the Lavadome's Aerial Guard in a sneak attack on Ghioz through the tunnels. Together, they humble the city, though Naf almost dies in the attempt, and when AuRon burns the Red Queen a mysterious blue light, invisible to all but dragon eyes, leaves her body and flies away. He discovers many other embryonic Red Queen bodies growing in magical tree roots deep under the tower. Meanwhile, Wistala was unable to rally Hypatia, but with a small force of firemaidens held the northern passes against Iron Riders for long months before rocs and dwarves forced her badly outnumbered forces into ineffective raids. Faced with a trickle of riders from the north and a more substantial force from the south, Hypatia surrenders. Nilrasha defies RuGaard's orders, and leads the firemaidens to rally Hypatia, leaving the Lavadome nearly undefended. Together, they rout the Ironriders and retake the city, though Nilrasha is almost fatally injured by collapsing building and forced to bite her own wing off. Over the next months, dragons and human survivors form a strong alliance and look for a better future.

=== Dragon Rule (Book 5) ===
Perspective: AuRon, Wistala and the Copper (RuGaard)

Dragon Rule is the fifth book and was released on 1 December 2009. Wistala, as sister to the Copper who is now Emperor of the Upper and Lower Worlds, is appointed proxy Queen by crippled Nilrasha, where she advances her ideas of political equality of hominids and dragons. Which puts her at odds with both her brothers, for the Copper has no use for the humans he now dominates, and AuRon, the rare scaleless grey, would isolate himself and his family from both the world of men and the world of dragons. The Copper sends AuRon to bring his old friend Naf's territory Dairuss into the Great Alliance, which he does successfully and becomes its protector. Imfamnia and NiVom, defectors and protectors of neighboring Ghioz, try to get him to join a conspiracy of dragon supremacists and Ibidio's traditionalists who want to see control returned to the Imperial bloodline. Though an assassination attempt, accusation of murder, and attack by Wheel of Fire dwarves all fail, it erodes the Copper's position sufficiently for a coup. The siblings, all tired by court intrigues, give up without a fight (though Nilrasha kills Ibidio when she comes to gloat). They go peacefully into exile on the Isle of Ice, only to be again attacked by a group led by Imfamnia, and flee to the isolated Sadda-Vale where Wistala secretly mates with DharSii.

=== Dragon Fate (Book 6) ===
Perspective: AuRon, Wistala and RuGaard

Dragon Fate starts out with RuGaard, Wistala and AuRon all taking shelter away from the Lavadome (as they were exiled in the last book). Wistala goes with DharSii to hunt a troll while AuRon has returned to visit his mate. While Wistala and DharSii are hunting, they learn that NiVom and Imfamnia have tried to take power from the twins and another clan war has broken out.

== Characters ==
=== Main characters ===
- AuRon (Auron, Long-Tail Fire-Heart, Firelong): AuRon is the champion of his clutch, being the last surviving male to remain on the egg shelf. He is rare among dragons in the fact that he has no scales, and thus is termed a "grey"; however, his skin color actually changes to match his surroundings. Scaleless, he is lighter and able to fly longer and faster than other dragons. He makes less sound than his scaled brethren. Additionally, AuRon has no appetite for metals, which normal dragons crave and consume to replace their scales. He is energetic and slightly headstrong, though he can be very serious and is extremely smart. AuRon is rare among dragons in that he keeps his egg tooth, which later hardens to become a horn of sorts, which he uses to aim his fire. In his opinion he believes dragons should not interfere with the tribulations of the hominid races, though he does see the problems of isolating himself in an area with no metal for his family.
- Wistala (Tala): Wistala, the first of two females to hatch in the clutch, has a sharp wit, and is very self-confident. Due to the traumatic destruction of her home, Wistala becomes something of a tomboy rather than being interested in typical dragonelle behavior, such as mating. Her scales are green, as is normal for most females. She shows a thirst for knowledge after being taken in under Rainfall and becomes a librarian of Hypatia. She also shows a particular interest in the dragon DharSii, who later becomes her love interest and eventual mate. From her mother she takes the lessons of how to improvise and to learn from the mistakes of the dragons from Silverhigh, a famed dragon empire destroyed by complacency. Though having promised her father to bear a fruitful clutch, she is the only dragon to remain unmated at the end of her book, though at the end of the series, she and DharSii are revealed to be expecting their second clutch of eggs (the first clutch was promised to Scabia in exchange for living in the Sadda Vale during their exile). She believes dragons can coexist peacefully with the hominids. She is stronger than most dragons (to the point where she can fly while wearing her brother RuGaard's armor) and is thicker scaled then most dragonelles.
- The Copper (RuGaard (Formal Adult name taken when wings come in), Rugaard): The Copper was the first of the three males in the clutch to hatch. Together with Auron, they killed the third male (who had ruby-red scales), but then Auron forced him off the egg shelf, dooming him to a life of namelessness and self-sufficiency (as their parents more or less would not pay attention to a male besides the clutchwinner). He learns to be very resourceful, though, even with the multiple debilitating injuries he acquires: a crippled leg from the fall off the egg shelf, a hurt eye from a fight with Wistala, a stab that cripples his wing from the Dragonblade (for which he eventually is given an artificial wing joint), and a stab to the fire bladder from a group of Demen. The only piece of advice given to him from his mother is to overcome and create a new line all his own. Out of all the siblings he seems to have been given the highest position, yet he still feels estranged from other dragons. He receives the name "Rugaard" upon reaching the Lavadome, though in the narration is still referred to as "The Copper". He is eventually killed by the trolls commanded by his former thrall, Rayg. However The Copper is rumored at the end of the series to still be alive. His survival is later confirmed to be true in the Novel Daughter of the Serpentine when he and his mate partake in the battle against the Rari Pirates.

=== Siblings' family ===
==== By heritage ====
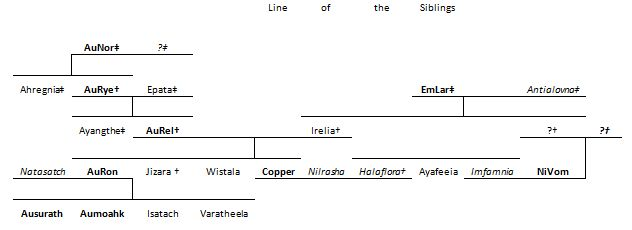
Italicized–names married into the family; Bold–names are male; †–Known to be dead; ‡–Status unknown; ?–Name unknown

- Jizara: Jizara is the only sibling that did not survive the raid of the Egg Cave. She is described as being thinner and longer than Wistala, and has a wonderful singing voice (as described by The Copper). She is also the only one who shows any real kindness to the Copper. She is killed by the Dragonblade during the raid of the Egg Cave, her last breaths being used to beg for mercy.
- The Red Hatchling: This red hatchling was the second male to hatch, but was killed by AuRon and the Copper.
- AuRel: A bronze dragon with a storied lineage. He is the father of the siblings. AuRel returns from hunting to find the Egg Cave being attacked. He escaped, but with serious injuries. Wistala finds AuRel wounded and unable to fly, and tries to heal him. While returning from a search to find metal for him, she unknowingly leads The Dragonblade to AuRel. AuRel attempts to fight The Dragonblade, but being injured makes him unable to fight. The Dragonblade kills AuRel as Wistala watches.
- Epata: The mother of AuRel.
- AuRye: A red dragon; the father of AuRel. After destroying an army of humans, he was killed when he faced a second army, filled with survivors of the old, that countered his tactics. A very famous dragon, from the Skotl clan of the Lavadome, AuRye was renowned for his thick scale and skill in warfare, smashing armies. He is recognized by AuRel as impulsive but also very mighty- one of the strongest dragons ever to exist.
- Irelia: The calm, sensible mother of the siblings. She is green, as is common for females. Irelia is killed in the Raid on the Egg Cave.
- Wistala I: The mother of Irelia, and thus the maternal grandmother of the Siblings.
- EmLar: The father of Irelia. He was the grey whose genes were passed to AuRon.
- NiVom: The grandson of EmLar, a cousin to the Siblings. Meets the Copper in the Drakwatch and becomes a full commander. As of Dragon Rule, the siblings and NiVom do not appear to be aware of their relation. NiVom is poisoned by Imfamnia, who is later revealed to be possessed by The Red Queen, in Dragon Fate.
- AuNor: The ancient ancestor of the siblings, whose line they belong.
- AuSurath: A red and the first of AuRon's sons, headstrong and impatient. He later joins the Aerial Host and rises to the position of commander of the Heavy Wing of the Aerial Host.
- AuMoakh: A gold and the second son of AuRon, observant and methodical. He serves as a messenger for the Grand Alliance and studies with the Ankelenes in the Lavadome.
- Varatheela: The first of AuRon's daughters. Talkative and social, she joins the Firemaids as a drakka and takes the second oath as a fully fledged dragonelle.
- Istach: The striped second daughter of AuRon, she is quiet, thoughtful, and "odd" because she is very protective of her parents. Istach is the only member of AuRon's first clutch to stay on the Island of Ice after the events of Dragon Strike. She resembles Jizara I.
- Aurue: A gray who is the direct descendant of AuRon. He debuts in Novice Dragoneer.
- Jizara II: A green dragonelle who is also directly descended from AuRon. She debuts in Novice Dragoneer and has inherited Wistala's interest in laws.

==== By mating ====
- Natasatch: A green female dragon who is enslaved and sold to the Wyrmmaster. Along with other females she was kept captive and forced to help the wizard breed his army for years, later helping to stage an uprising and evicting the humans from the isle. She becomes AuRon's mate at the end of Dragon Champion. In "Dragon Rule" she develops a keen interest in the newly emergent Empire society that leads to her separation from AuRon during his exile.
- Nilrasha: An ex-Firemaiden, she worked alongside the Copper during the events of Dragon Outcast and fell in love in spite of (or maybe perhaps because of) his unique physical disabilities. She is the center of much controversy, partly because of her breaking the Firemaiden's oath of virginity to mate with the Copper and also because of the suspicious circumstances surrounding Halaflora's death which many believe she was directly responsible for. The aristocracy of the Lavadome resent her meek beginnings and accuse her of being a relentless social climber. She is later injured during the Battle of Hypatia and rendered flightless, leading to her being forced into an unofficial retirement from the political scene. She makes a cameo appearance alongside the Copper dubbed the "Duchess" and "Duke" respectively in Daughter of the Serpentine during the Rari Campaign.
- Halaflora: The sickly granddaughter of FeHazathant and Tighlia, she becomes RuGaard's first mate through an arranged mating by Tighlia as a means to legally bind him to the family, although the Copper doesn't truly love her. Although the circumstances of her death is unclear - as the only one around at the time is Nilrasha and she has motive to kill Halaflora - Nilrasha claims that Halaflora thought herself pregnant and, confused, starts to rapidly consume meat. However, Halaflora's sickly nature made her too weak and she chokes on a piece of bone and dies. The Copper and many others view the story with skepticism, but do not dare voice their opinion to Nilrasha.

In Dragon Rule However, Nilrasha reveals the full story of Halaflora's death to her sister in-law. Nilrasha confirms that while she did not kill Halaflora she may have been somewhat responsible for her death as while Halaflora did choke on a piece of meat, Nilrasha briefly hesitated to assist Halaflora due to the former's feelings towards the Copper. However Nilrasha pulled herself together and attempted help Halaflora but it was already too late as Halaflora had already lost too much oxygen and died. It is unknown if Nisrasha confessed this to the Copper or if the latter figured it out in his later years.

- DharSii: First appears in Dragon Avenger, is mentioned in Dragon Outcast, features in Dragon Strike and Dragon Rule as well as Dragon Fate. Described as orange or red with several dark stripes along his back. According to several other characters in the series, striped dragons like DharSii are usually sterile and rarely father hatchlings. Former commander of the Aerial Host in the Lavadome. The name DharSii is an assumed name taken after a fatal duel with AgGriffopse, Tyr FeHazathant's only son. DharSii translates roughly as sure-claw or quick-claw, a reference to the manner of AgGriffopse's death. Wistala and DharSii secretly mated in Vesshall, producing a clutch given to Scabia's daughter in exchange for living in Vesshall. At the end of the series, they are revealed to be expecting another clutch they intend to raise themselves and have revealed that they are mated. In Novice Dragoneer Dharshii takes residence in the Vale Republic as "The Lodger". He gives up his life saving Illeth (Whom he befriended) from Gorgantern.

=== Recurring characters ===
- Hazeleye: Hazeleye is an elf who captures, studies, and traffics dragons. Despite her job she displays a great deal of compassion for dragons and is often at odds with her compatriots. She frees AuRon as a hatchling after growing disillusioned with a dragon-trapping trade and is crippled for her actions. She is one of the only characters to interact with all three of the siblings.
- The Dragonblade (Drakossozh):The Dragonblade is a man who dedicated his life to hunting down dragons; he has two weapons designed to do just that, a spear, Byltzarn (the White Spear of Lightning), and a sword, Dunherr (the Thunder's Edge). He is hired by Gobold to get revenge upon two dragons that cheated him. As a result, he directly kills AuRel and Jizara. In his career only three dragons survive or are spared by the Dragonblade: AuRon, Wistala and The Copper. He is one of the only characters to interact with all three of the siblings. At the end of Dragon Avenger Wistala and he put an end to their mutual feud and he retires, only reluctantly battling the Copper at the end of Dragon Outcast. The Copper killed him in their final duel.
- Eliam Dragonblade: Son of the Dragonblade, he is seen as short-tempered and arrogant. In contrast to his father he is sadistic and cowardly; more of an executioner than a warrior and afraid to face dragons on equal terms. He lost his left eye to Wistala during the sacking of Mossbell and is killed by AuRon during the revolt on The Isle of Ice.
- Rayg: An inventive young human, he is the son of Lada and Thane Hammar. He is eventually acquired by the dragons of the Lavadome and becomes a thrall of the Imperial Line. His expertise gains him great recognition from the Copper. It was he began construction on a bridge and invented the brace for the Copper's damaged wing, the Copper often comes to him for advice and promises to free him if he completes his bridge project. Despite the Copper's promises Rayg is never freed, usually because of his various unfinished projects. He is pragmatic and does not seem too troubled by his enslavement. In Dragon Fate, Rayg conspires with Imfamnia (later revealed to be possessed by the Red Queen of the Ghioz) to overthrow dragonkind. He breeds an army of supersoldiers by feeding dragonblood to the Demen Legion while also digging tunnels in the Lower World to allow their transport. He also breeds a host of trolls on dragonblood, controlling them through a crystal. This mutates them into scaled monsters with wings, which he augments by creating dragonblooded Griffaran guards, which sacrifice speed for size and power. To end all challenge to his plans, he destroys the Heavy Wing of the Aerial Host in an ambush, overcoming the most powerful force under the sun by ambushing them in their sleep with his trolls. Most of the Aerial Host is killed along with the Grand Commander of the Aerial Host. He is killed when he flees the siblings with Imfamnia, whose wings fail her, sending them plummeting to their deaths.
- Imfamnia: the self-centered granddaughter of Tyr FeHazathant, and daughter of AgGriffopse and Ibidio. Though described as "a brainless piece of fluff", she schemes her way to power several times. As a drakka, she falsely accuses her friend NiVom of attacking her, to clear the way for SiDrakkon to become Tyr and mate her. During his short, unpopular reign, she gets him to name her half-brother SiMevolant as heir, and mates him as well, becoming queen a second time when SiDrakkon dies. Her scandalous affairs during this period earn her the title "the Jade Queen". After SiMevolant's downfall, she flees to Ghioz and takes NiVom as a mate. After the defeat of Ghioz, NiVom intercedes with the Copper and they become protectors of Ghioz province in the Grand Alliance, though at this time she is possessed by the Red Queen. Failing to seduce AuRon when he becomes protector of a neighboring province, she instead cultivates a false friendship with Natasatch, creates a superarmy using NiVom's blood, nearly succeeds in assassinating the Copper and Wistala in the baths, and orders a surprise attack that nearly succeeds in overthrowing dragonkind (see Rayg above).
- Rhea (girl): One of the many thralls that belong to the Dragons of the Lavadome. She is never shown to speak in the stories and is assumed to be mute. She is married to Rayg and the two of them have children together. She is the only unbiased eyewitness to Halaflora's death.
- Naf Touraq: A mysterious man from the east who has an enormous sense of humour. He becomes a commander in the military and later king of his own lands. He is perhaps the only human that AuRon truly trusts.
- Hieba: A girl rescued by Naf and raised by AuRon for a year of her childhood. She grows up and falls in love with Naf, but is held captive by the Red Queen.
- Gobold/Fangbreaker: Dwarf of The Wheel of Fire, who eventually becomes their king after killing one of the previous rulers. Gobold had sought revenge upon AuRel and Irelia for (from his perspective) betraying him in a deal that resulted in the pair gaining their home cave. Gobold received the name Fangbreaker when he killed Irelia by smashing her jaws with his fist. He himself is betrayed from within the Wheel of Fire by Wistala in an act of vengeance.

=== Other important characters ===
==== In Dragon Champion ====
- The Dawn Roarers: A pack of wolves that AuRon joins after devastating most of the members. They consist of the leader, Hard-Legs Black-Bristle, and members Bright-Sight Fey-Bark, Way-Nose High-Star, and Long-Tail Fire-Heart (AuRon). Their descendants go on to guard the Isle of Ice under AuRon's dominion and help keep his hatchlings entertained.
- Djer: A tradesdwarf of the Chartered Company of the Diadem who frees AuRon of his slave collar and takes him to his company to offer a job. Thanks to the friendship and actions of AuRon, Djer becomes a partner of the Chartered Company. During a later battle Djer is burned badly by a dragon, his body charred inside and out. He suffers until AuRon finds Djer and ends his suffering. Djer is also seen by Wistala in chapter nine of "Dragon Avenger", where she decides not to kill him after seeing him leave his meal to go cold while he tends to an injured pony. Although he is not named, Wistala notices his oddly tall boots, a nod to his nickname "Djer Highboots".
- NooMoahk: A decrepit but wise black dragon, many millennia old. In his final years he teaches AuRon wisdom and languages. In the writing he is shown to have a failing mind and little distinction between long term and short term memory, possibly due to the effects of prolonged exposure to a mysterious crystal he guards. He later dies fighting AuRon during one such lapse when AuRon is forced to trick NooMoahk into impaling himself on a monument dedicated to the elder dragon's late human friend Tindairus. It is possible that he is an ancestor of the siblings. AuRon is reverent of him to the point that he even takes a false-name similar to his when investigating the Isle of Ice and even names his one of sons after him.
- Wrimere The Wyrmmaster:: An old wizard who is breeding dragons on the Isle of Ice to be obedient to their human masters; He does this to the purpose of waging a genocide on the elves and dwarves of the world. By manipulating hatchling dragons tendencies to imprint on the first thing they see, he raises dragons as war mounts and enslaves the females as a 'breeding stock'. He commits suicide after AuRon overthrows the dragon riders.

==== In Dragon Avenger ====
- Bartleghaff (condor): The leader of a large flock of mountain condors. He is AuRel's oldest friend, though his first appearance would lead you to think otherwise. Wistala meets him as he is waiting for AuRel to die, so he can give his flock the signal to begin feeding on the body. However, it seems this is what AuRel wished for his old friend to do. AuRel jokes about not wanting some stranger getting the best meat for themselves, and Bartleghaff laments that the feast his family would have off of AuRel's corpse would be remembered at every cliff-sit for the next century.
- Rainfall: An elf who cares for Wistala after she narrowly escapes the Dragonblade. He is chivalrous and courteous, introducing Wistala to Hypatian traditions and fostering her interest in them. Rainfall plots with Wistala to stave off Thane Hammar's advances on his familial land, and to this end legally adopts Wistala as his daughter. He is killed by a vindictive Thane Hammar during the sacking of Mossbell
- Yari-Tab (cat): A cat befriended by Wistala.
- Avalanche (horse): Rainfall's horse, once belonged to Rainfall's son. He feels guilty because he wasn't able to prevent his previous master's death. He is killed during the battle with the troll.
- Thane Hammar: The thane of the part of Hypatia that Rainfall lives in. He has a long and bitter rivalry with the old elf, taking his granddaughter captive and impregnating her. He conspires with barbarians to further his own position. He later gains an infamous reputation and the title "Dwarfhanger." Wistala plays him against the dwarves and avenges Rainfall's death by taking him and dropping him among a group of desperate warrior dwarves.
- Stog (mule): A mule previously owned by the Dragonblade and longed for the glory days he had with his group despite his friendship with Wistala. He has a bit of a negative attitude, but he proves to be smarter and a much harder worker than most horses. He is shot and killed by Barbarians while trying to protect Mossbell.
- Lada: Rainfall's granddaughter and mother of Rayg. She is held captive by Thane Hammar as a part of his rivalry with Rainfall and develops Stockholm syndrome, believing that he loves her. Upon her return she is an impudent brat who resents Rainfall separating her from the Thane and competes with Wistala for Rainfall's affection. She eventually gains a measure of wisdom following a pregnancy and time in the circus.
- Circus Members: A traveling circus consisting of various performers and handlers. Led by the elf Ragwrist who is kindly but tight-fisted and often bemoans the expenses of his circus. Notable members are Dsossa, an elf horse trainer, Intanta, a wizened old fortune teller and Brok, a dwarf in charge of the beasts of burden. Wistala and Lada become members for a brief time.
- Dragons of the Sadda-Vale: Distant relatives of AuRon, Wistala and the Copper. They do not feel that dragons should concern themselves with anything outside of their own territory, even if it is the killing of another dragon family. The only one to show any sense among them in DharSii who stays there sparingly and leaves there hurriedly.

==== In Dragon Outcast ====
- The bats: A family of bats that assist The Copper in exchange for his blood, and his saving their lives. They accompany him to the Lavadome where they act as a spy and messenger force for him, and later the Lavadome. After a few generations of feeding almost entirely on dragons blood several bats become large and almost dragon-like, earning the nickname gargoyles.
- Tyr FeHazathant: An old male dragon (deep red/purple) who is the ruler of the Lavadome dragons. He adopts the Copper into the Imperial family after the latter "saves" some griffaran eggs. The Copper sees him as an adoptive grandfather and is devoutly loyal to him. FeHazathant dies shortly after the Copper/RuGaard, informs him of a potential plot against him by SiDrakkon. The Tyr dies under unknown circumstances, naming the Copper as his heir to Tighlia before his death.
- Tighlia: The old mate of Tyr FeHazathant. Wise but can be seen as calculating and cold-hearted. She has a low opinion of the Copper and forces him to marry her sickly granddaughter Halaflora. She dies at the hands of the Dragonblade
- SiDrakkon: A deep red-purple male who is brother to Tighlia. Often bad-tempered but a capable military leader. Has an unhealthy obsession with the smell (and taste) of human thralls. Inherits the position of Tyr from his brother-in-law FeHazathant. Dies under suspicious circumstances.
- SiMevolant: A gold, grandson of the Tyr. Lazy and apathetic, often described as an idiot by the rest of the Imperial Line. He shows his true deviousness in orchestrating the assassination of SiDrakkon with his sister Infamnia and takes the position of Tyr. Willingly submits to the authority of the Dragonblade. Is killed in a duel by the Copper and Nilrasha. Large and thick scaled.
- NoSohoth: The silver majordomo of the Imperial Line. A loyal dragon, but a stickler for protocol.
- NeStirrath: The red commander of the Drakwatch, lost his wings in a past battle. Mentor and father figure to the Copper. He dies in the final battle against the Wyrmmaster's dragon riders.
- Rethothana: An Anklene scholar and ally of the Copper
- Firemaids: The female military branch of the Lavadome. They came about during the first dragon war to protect and defend eggs and hatchlings. The firemaids have three oaths: the first, taken as drakkas, to serve; the second, upon reaching maturity, to secure an official position within the ranks; and finally the third oath, taken when dragonelles are ready to devote themselves entirely to the organization, a vow of chastity. Has a friendly rivalry with the Drakwatch.
- Drakwatch: The male military branch for young drakes in the Lavadome. Taken by many as the chance for glory and advancement. Has a friendly rivalry with the Firemaids. After the establishment of the Aerial Host it withers down to a cadre of outcast and impoverished families.

==== In Dragon Strike ====
- The Red Queen of Ghioz: The ruler of Ghioz and commander of a powerful alliance of outlying forces. She frequently tells AuRon she "cannot be bothered" with dying, and though assassinated by Naf and later burned by Auron in the defeat of Ghioz, he suspects a mysterious blue light that leaves her dying body will allow her to continue. He finds and kills many other Red Queen bodies in a magical chamber below her mountain palace. Despite killing off her supply of bodies, the Red Queen lives long enough to possess Infamnia, and allies herself with Rayg to overthrow dragon kind. After being defeated by AuRon and Wistala, she and Rayg escape to continue the fight another day, the Red Queen loses control of her ability to fly, causing her and Rayg to fall to their deaths, ending their terror once and for all.
- Ayafeeia: The leader of the Firemaidens. Her example of fierce protection of all dragon hatchlings so impresses Wistala that she joins the Firemaidens herself. She initially leads the small force holding the north passes of Hypatia against the Ironriders, but leaves Wistala in charge when RuGaard orders her to return. She joins Nilrasha's counterstrike, and helps retake Hypatia.
- Takea: A fierce dragonelle of the Firemaids, killed in fighting in the northern passes.
- HeBellereth: Leader of the Aerial Host, loyal to RuGaard, involved in retaking the Lavadome and the humbling of Ghioz.
- LaDibar: A highly intelligent, but somewhat obstructionist dragon of the Lavadome.
- Paskinix: The king and general of the Demen. Defeated and twice captured by Lavadome forces, he is converted to an ally and helps RuGaard discover a subterranean attack route to Ghioz.
- NiVom: A white dragon, secretly mated to Imfamnia, wife of Tyr SiMevolant. The two fled his defeat at the end of Dragon Outcast, and joined the Red Queen of Ghioz. He participates in a raid on Wistala's cave, and is captured by RuGaard before the attack on Ghioz, but released to warn the citizens of the impending battle. He is later killed in battle in Dragon Fate
