= William Horwood (novelist) =

British writer

- Born: 12 May 1944 (age 82); Oxford, England
- Occupation: Novelist
- Writing career
- Pen name: James Conan
- Period: 1980–present
- Genres: Fantasy, Children's Literature, Fiction
- Website: www.williamhorwood.co.uk

William Horwood (born 12 May 1944 in Oxford) is an English novelist. He grew up on the East Kent coast, primarily in Deal, within a family fractious with "parental separation, secret illegitimacy, alcoholism and genteel poverty".

Between the ages of six and ten, he was raised in foster care, attended school in Germany for a year, then went on to Grammar School at age eleven. In his eighteenth year, he attended Bristol University to study geography, after which he had any number of jobs—fundraising and teaching, among others, as well as editing for the Daily Mail.

In 1978, at age 34, he retired from the newspaper in order to pursue novel-writing as his primary career, inspired by some long-ago reading of Frances Hodgson Burnett's The Secret Garden.

His first novel, Duncton Wood, an allegorical tale about a community of moles, was published in 1980. It was followed by two sequels, forming The Duncton Chronicles, and also a second trilogy, The Book of Silence. William Horwood has also written two stand-alone novels intertwining the lives of humans and of eagles (The Stonor Eagles and Callanish), and The Wolves of Time duology. Skallagrigg, his 1987 novel about disability, love, and trust, was made into a BBC film in 1994. In addition, he has written a number of sequels to the 1908 novel The Wind in the Willows by Kenneth Grahame.

Boy with No Shoes, published in August 2004, is a fictionalised memoir that explores challenging themes of childhood in Kent.

In 2007, he collaborated with historian Helen Rappaport to produce Dark Hearts of Chicago, a historical mystery and thriller set in nineteenth-century Chicago. It was re-published in 2008 as City of Dark Hearts with some significant revisions and cuts under the pen name James Conan.

After almost fifteen years, Horwood returned to his hallmark genre of fantasy, publishing the first novel in his Hyddenworld quartet in 2010. Each novel is thematically based on a season — the first is Hyddenworld: Spring, the next to be published was Hyddenworld: Awakening followed by Hyddenworld: Harvest and Hyddenworld: Winter and deals with the adventures of a cast of humans and 'hydden' ('little folk,' with some distinct fae overtones) on a quest to find gems holding the powers of the season for which each is named. "If they can be brought together they may combine to re-kindle the fires of a dying universe."

== Bibliography ==
=== The Duncton Chronicles ===
1. Duncton Wood (1980)
2. Duncton Quest (1988)
3. Duncton Found (1989)

=== The Book of Silence ===
1. Duncton Tales (1991)
2. Duncton Rising (1992)
3. Duncton Stone (1993)

=== The Wolves of Time ===
1. Journeys to the Heartland (Hardcover 1995, Paperback 1996)
2. Seekers at the Wulfrock (Hardcover 1997, Paperback 1998)

=== Tales of the Willows ===
- The Willows in Winter (Hardcover 1993)
- Toad Triumphant (Hardcover 1995)
- The Willows and Beyond (Hardcover 1996)
- The Willows at Christmas (Hardcover 1999)

=== Hyddenworld ===
- Hyddenworld: Spring (Spring 2010)
- Hyddenworld: Awakening (2011)
- Hyddenworld: Harvest (2012)
- Hyddenworld: Winter (2013)

=== Standalone novels ===
- The Stonor Eagles (Hardcover 1982, Paperback 1983)
- Callanish (Hardcover 1984, Paperback 1985)
- Skallagrigg (Hardcover 1987, Paperback 1988)
- The Boy With No Shoes (Hardcover 2004, Paperback 2005)
- Dark Hearts of Chicago (2007) with Helen Rappaport
