= Sione Tuipulotu =

Sione Tuipulotu or Sione Tui'pulotu may refer to:

- Sione Tuipulotu (rugby union, born February 1997), Australian-born Scottish international rugby union player
- Sione Tuipulotu (rugby union, born December 1997), New Zealand-born Tongan international rugby union player
- Sione Tuʻipulotu (born 1978), Tongan rugby union player
