= Duncton Wood =

1980 novel by William Horwood

- Author: William Horwood
- Cover artist: John Barber
- Language: English
- Series: Duncton Wood
- Genre: Fantasy
- Publisher: McGraw-Hill
- Publication date: March 1980
- Publication place: United Kingdom
- Media type: Print (hardback and paperback)
- Pages: 736 pp (paperback edition)
- ISBN: 0-07-030434-3 (hardback edition) & ISBN 0-600-20434-0 (paperback edition)
- OCLC: 5674643
- Dewey Decimal: 823/.9/14
- LC Class: PZ4.H8246 Du 1980 PR6058.O719
- Followed by: Duncton Quest

Duncton Wood is the first novel by English author William Horwood. It is the first of a six-volume fantasy series of the same name.

== Series overview ==
Duncton Wood and its sequels have as its protagonists anthropomorphic moles living in Moledom, a community in Great Britain. Moledom has its own social organization, history, and written language. The moles do not otherwise make use of technology or clothing.

The other focus of the Duncton series is the Stone, a religion based on the standing stones and stone circles of Britain. The novels are mainly set in and around megalith sites such as Avebury and Rollright. The eponymous wood itself is fictional, inspired by Wittenham Clumps and Wytham Woods (both near Oxford, where the author was living when he wrote the first book), and borrows its name from a village in West Sussex.

In the course of the books, individual moles travel great distances quite quickly (Duncton Wood in Oxfordshire to Siabod in Wales and back again, for example).

== The Duncton Chronicles ==
The first volume, originally written as a standalone novel, tells the story of the romance between the Duncton moles Bracken and Rebecca as the long-held traditions surrounding the Duncton Stone recede under the rule of Rebecca's tyrannical father Mandrake and the evil and manipulative Rune.

Almost a decade later, Horwood completed two directly related sequels that follow the events of the first book, in which the central character is Bracken and Rebecca's son Tryfan. Duncton Quest (1988) and Duncton Found (1989) depict a religious conflict between The Stone and an opposing crusading order known as The Word. In the midst of these events is the birth and martyrdom of the Stone Mole, a focal messianic Christ figure named Beechen.

== The Book of Silence ==
Duncton Tales takes place generations later, following Duncton Found. The inhabitants of the now-flourishing Duncton system look upon the events of the past with reverence. Prior to its completion, Duncton Tales, originally conceived as a stand-alone sequel, had evolved into the first volume of a second trilogy. The story tells of the archival librarian mole Privet and her adopted son Whillan as they face the rise of an inquisitorial cult that calls itself The Newborns. The series continues with Duncton Rising (1992) and Duncton Stone (1993)

== Editions ==
- 1980 Country Life Books ISBN 0600367940
- 1980 Book Club Associates (London)
- 1980 McGraw-Hill ISBN 0070304343
- 1981 (September) Hamlyn ISBN 0600204340
- 1981 (January) Ballantine Books ISBN 0345291131
- 1983 (December) Ballantine Books ISBN 034531770X
- 1985 (July) Arrow Books
- 1986 (July) Ballantine Books ISBN 0345341899
- 1989 (July) Arrow Books ISBN 0099443007
- 1990 (June) Arrow Books ISBN 0099443007
