= HarperPrism =

Defunct American publishing imprint

- Parent company: HarperCollins
- Status: defunct
- Founded: 1993
- Successor: Eos
- Country of origin: United States
- Headquarters location: New York City
- Key people: John Silbersack
- Publication types: books
- Fiction genres: science fiction and fantasy

HarperPrism (1993–1999) was launched by John Silbersack, Publishing Director, in 1993 as the first science fiction and fantasy imprint of HarperCollins Publishers in the United States. Prism's early authors included Stephen Baxter, Terry Pratchett, Isaac Asimov, and Clive Barker as well as many media and gaming tie-ins such as Magic: The Gathering and The X-Files.

When HarperCollins acquired Avon Books in 1999, the Harper Prism imprint was absorbed into the Avon Eos line.
