= The Hearth and Eagle =

First US edition (publ. Houghton Mifflin)

The Hearth and Eagle is a historical novel by Anya Seton. Set primarily in the old New England fishing village of Marblehead, Massachusetts, the story centers on strong-willed, passionate Hesper Honeywood and her search for love and fulfillment at a time when women had few options and the stormy Atlantic often claimed the lives of poor fishermen. Seton started researching her ancestors in the mid-1940s, which led her to Marblehead and the setting for her fourth novel.

== Plot summary ==
Hesper Honeywood's family have run Marblehead's finest inn, the Hearth and Eagle, for generations. Hesper grows up listening to stories about the patient, obedient, and deeply religious women in her family's past who all put their husband's dreams ahead of their own. Though Hesper copies her mother's stoic and pious demeanor, she secretly dreams of a life of passion and romance.

As she enters adolescence, Hesper idolizes Johnny Peach, a neighbor boy who is cheerful, good-natured, and quietly protective of the oddly excitable red-head. Hesper is often teased by the other children, and Johnny is the one person in Marblehead she genuinely likes and trusts. She is absolutely crushed when he is killed at sea in the Civil War.

Not long after the war is over, Hesper, by now a beautiful and voluptuous young woman, is spotted walking on the beach by artist Evan Redlake, who is sketching among the dunes. Evan is an avant-garde painter from a prominent family, and his fiercely passionate nature and reckless ways captivate Hesper. The two of them marry and move to New York City, where they move in a set of early Bohemians, including the painters Homer Martin and John La Farge. Evan neglects Hesper for his painting, and after she has a miscarriage, their relationship breaks down for good. Evan leaves for Europe and Hesper returns to Marblehead, assisted in her journey by Amos Porterman, a wealthy factory owner who has just relocated his business to Marblehead.

Although cautious of the idea of marriage for quite some time, Hesper ultimately obtains a divorce from Evan and marries the stolid Amos. While the marriage is not a passionate one, Amos is utterly besotted with his statuesque, flame-haired wife. He spends freely on Hesper's every whim, buying her the latest clothes and sending her to the most fashionable spas and resorts. Hesper soon becomes a lady of leisure who enjoys a life of luxurious comfort, though she has moments of dissatisfaction and her hard-bitten mother says bluntly that Honeywood women are built for work, not for pleasure.

The years of lazy contentment end abruptly with a terrible fire in the village of Marblehead. Amos' factory is utterly destroyed and he is ruined. Overnight he goes from being the richest man in town to a mere shadow of his former self. Destitute, he seeks work as a sailmaker, but cannot adjust to his new role. Hesper, meanwhile, has taken over management of the Hearth and Eagle from her aging mother. The inn soon becomes more successful than ever and Hesper emerges as the main breadwinner of her family. Despairing and utterly crushed, Amos soon dies, leaving Hesper to raise her children alone and to become the wise head of the family. At the end of her long life, she reflects that while men draw strength from money or power or acts of heroism, a woman's strength always comes from within.

== Reception ==
Kirkus Reviews noted, "more ambitious novel than its predecessors, Dragonwyck and The Turquoise, it seems derivative, imitative, and too dependent on the panoply of history and the changing scene over a long life than on the significance of characterization".
