= Dragonwyck =

Dragonwyck may refer to:

- Dragonwyck (novel), a historical romance novel by Anya Seton, first published in 1945
- Dragonwyck (film), a 1946 film directed by Joseph L. Mankiewicz, based on the novel
