= Katherine (Seton novel) =

1954 novel by Anya Seton

- First edition
- Author: Anya Seton
- Audio read by: Wanda McCaddon
- Language: English
- Genre: Historical Romance
- Publisher: Houghton Mifflin
- Publication date: 1954
- Publication place: United States
- Media type: Print (Hardback & Paperback)

Katherine is a 1954 historical novel by American author Anya Seton. It tells the story of the historically important, 14th-century love affair in England between the eponymous Katherine Swynford and John of Gaunt, Duke of Lancaster, the third surviving son of King Edward III.

At the time of its publication, Kirkus Reviews called it the author's "most distinguished book". In 2003, Katherine was ranked 95 in the BBC's Big Read survey of Britain's best-loved novels. It is commonly regarded as a prime example of historical fiction and has been continuously in print since its publication date.

== Plot summary ==
Katherine tells the true story of Katherine de Roet, born the daughter of a minor Flemish herald, later knight. Katherine has no obvious prospects, except that her sister Philippa Roet is a waiting-woman to Queen Philippa, wife of King Edward III, and betrothed to (later the wife of) Geoffrey Chaucer, then a minor court official. By virtue of this connection, Katherine meets and marries Sir Hugh Swynford of Lincolnshire and gives birth to a son, Thomas, and a daughter, Blanchette.

After Hugh's death, Katherine becomes the mistress of John of Gaunt, Duke of Lancaster, and bears him four children out of wedlock; they are given the surname 'Beaufort' after one of the Duke's possessions. She is also appointed official governess to the Duke's two daughters by his first wife, Blanche of Lancaster, and helps raise his son by Blanche, the future King Henry IV. The Duke and Katherine separate for a number of years, immediately following Wat Tyler's Peasants' Revolt in 1381, when the rioting peasants sacked and burnt the Duke's Savoy Palace to the ground. The novel's explanation for their separation is Katherine's shock over revelations concerning the death of her husband. However, the couple eventually reconcile and marry after the death of the Duke's second wife. The Beaufort children, now grown, are legitimised by royal and papal decrees after Katherine and the Duke are married.

== Reception ==
Katherine is considered Seton's most well-known work as well as the best-known depiction of Katherine herself. In 2003, Katherine was ranked 95 in the BBC's Big Read survey of Britain's best-loved novels. It is commonly regarded as a prime example of historical fiction and romance, with Vanora Bennett of The Independent noting in 2010 that it "set the benchmark in high-medieval romance, and few have matched her since". It has been continuously in print since its publication date.

In 2006, Margaret Moser of the Austin Chronicle described the novel as "a glorious example of romance in its most classic literary sense: exhilarating, exuberant, and rich with the jeweled tones of England in the 1300s". Nick Rennison believes that the novel has retained its popularity "because of the skill with which [Seton] evokes the world her heroine enters and because Katherine herself remains such a powerful character".

=== Criticism ===
As a historical romance, Katherine is considered well written and carefully researched, given that Seton was not a historian or paleographer and was working in the 1950s, when sources were less widely available. It diverges comparatively little from known history, though since archival documentation of Katherine's life is limited, it does contain some necessary conjecture. Though subsequent non-fiction accounts of Katherine, including those by historians Alison Weir and Jeanette Lucraft, make clear that Seton's various speculations were partly and sometimes significantly incorrect, the novel does provide the reader with a reasonably accurate view of medieval England, life at court, and the lives of women in the 14th century, along with intelligent and sensitive glimpses of Chaucer, Katherine's brother-in-law.

In addition, Katherine is one of the few fictional texts that include writings by the Blessed Julian of Norwich, a character in the novel, who is considered one of England's greatest mystics and whose Revelations of Divine Love was the first book written in English by a woman. Katherine is also considered one of the greatest examples of a historical-fiction love story ever written. In a poll conducted in the 1990s by Ladies' Home Journal, the novel ranked among the top-ten all-time best love stories.

Weir was inspired by Katherine to become an author of historical fiction, and the novel would also later inspire her non-fiction study, Katherine Swynford: The Story of John of Gaunt and his Scandalous Duchess (2008) (U.S. title, Mistress of the Monarchy, The Life of Katherine Swynford, Duchess of Lancaster). It examines Seton's novel in historiographic terms and, while praising its general historical accuracy, categorizes it as primarily a feminist romance.

== Other editions ==
Philippa Gregory wrote a foreword published in the 2004 edition.

A 2004 audiobook is read by Wanda McCaddon.
