= Greenwich Point =

Coordinates: 41°00′12″N 73°34′37″W

- Greenwich Point Historic District
- U.S. National Register of Historic Places
- U.S. Historic district
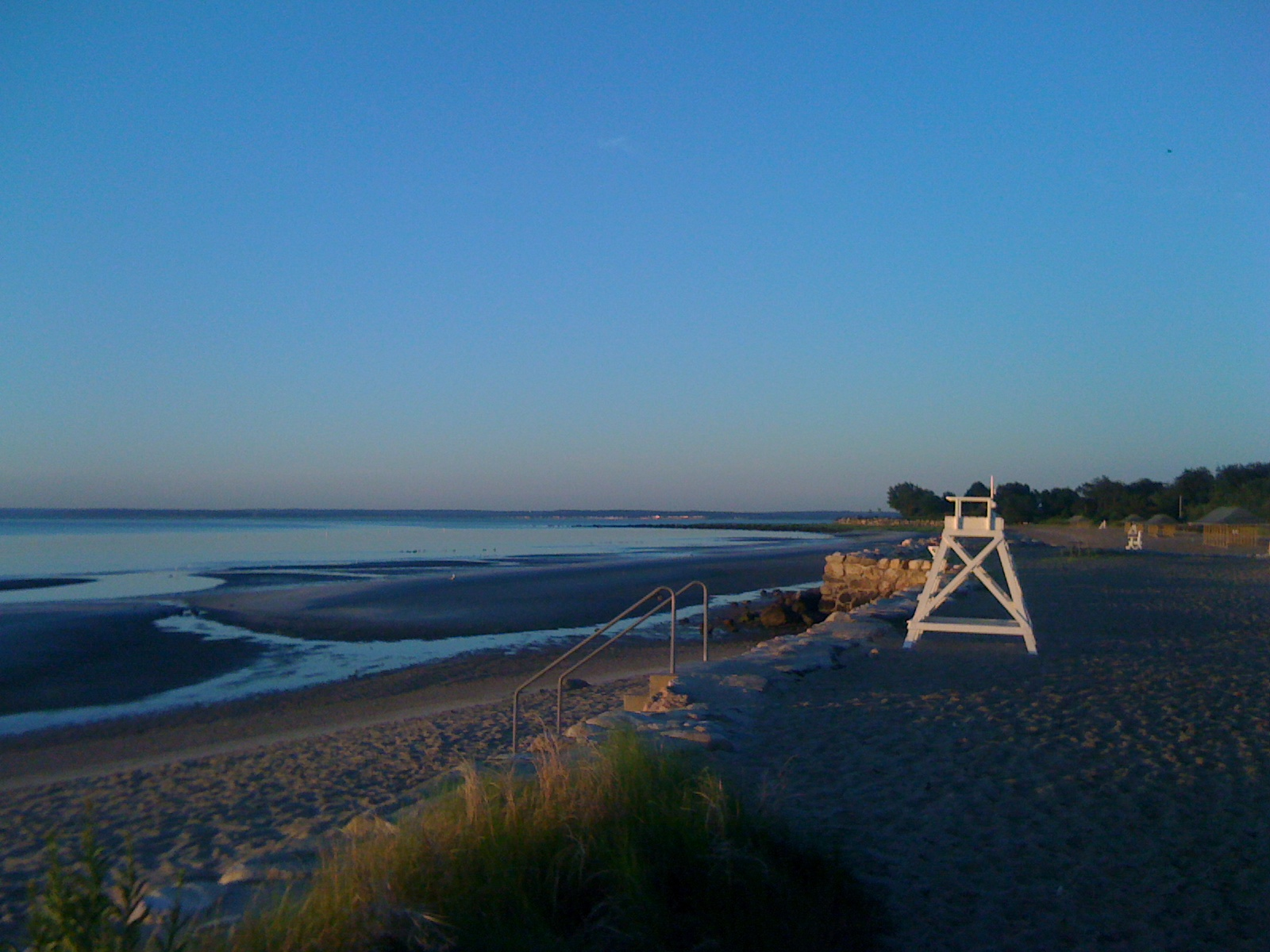
- Sunrise at Greenwich Point
- Location: Tod's Driftway at Shore Road, Greenwich, Connecticut
- Area: 147 acres (59 ha)
- NRHP reference No.: 100004671
- Added to NRHP: July 12, 2021

Greenwich Point is one of four beaches located in Greenwich, Connecticut. The beach sits on a peninsula jutting into Long Island Sound. It is a popular spot for Greenwich families to spend the day. Visitors to Greenwich Point typically jog, walk, or cycle around the Point, fish, boat, or swim in the Long Island Sound, study nature, or sunbathe.

== History ==
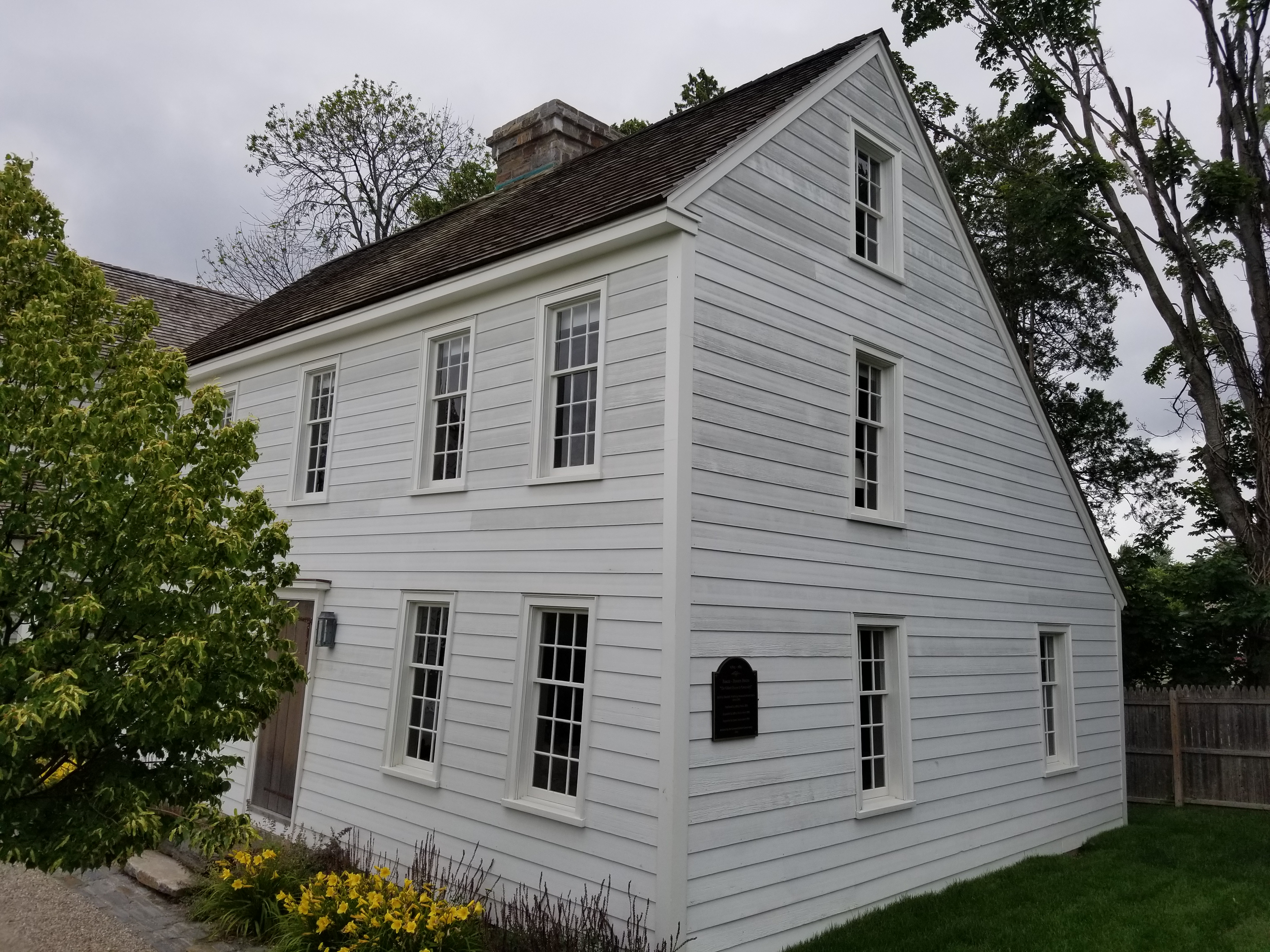
Feake-Ferris House (circa 1645) near Greenwich Point

The area of land that is now Greenwich Point was first used by the Siwanoy Indians as a fishing camp during the summer months. The Siwanoys called the land Monakewego, meaning “shining sands.” In 1640, Captain Daniel Patrick and Robert Feake and Elizabeth Feake purchased the land from the Indians for 25 coats and some small trinkets. The area came to be known as Elizabeth’s Neck due to her love for the island, and she lived nearby in the Feake-Ferris House (c. 1645). In 1730, a member of the Ferris family bought the land. The family retained ownership over the land for more than 150 years.

In the 1880s, the banker and railroad tycoon John Kennedy Tod purchased the land. Tod called his waterfront estate “Innis Arden” and constructed a causeway to provide access to the main land. Tod also constructed a lake from a tidal marsh and built a road around this lake. He erected a stone mansion, boat house, guest cottage, and several other buildings on his land. Many of these buildings are still in use today by the town. Tod also built a nine-hole golf course. Tod originally opened his property and golf course to Old Greenwich residents and guests staying at local inns. Eventually, he came to believe that his hospitality was being abused, so Tod closed the point to everyone but his invited guests. Tod died in 1925 and his wife, Marie Howard Potter Tod, died in 1939. The Tods had no heirs, so Tod willed the property to the Presbyterian Hospital of New York. The Hospital used the land as a retreat for nurses until World War II began.

On December 13, 1944, the Trustees of Presbyterian Hospital sold the 148.5-acre property to the Town of Greenwich for $550,000. In 1946, Tod’s stone mansion was converted into 13 family apartments for veterans returning from World War II. These apartments were used until 1961, when the mansion was demolished due to it falling into disrepair.

Greenwich Point was listed on the National Register of Historic Places in 2021.

== Policies ==
Greenwich Point is open daily from 6:00 a.m. until sunset. Beach passes are required for entrance to Greenwich Point from May 1 to October 31. Lifeguards are on duty at the Point from Memorial Day weekend through Labor Day weekend from 10:00 a.m. to 6:00 p.m.

Leashed dogs are allowed on Greenwich Point from December 1 to March 31. No dogs are allowed on the beach during the summer months.

== Amenities ==
Greenwich Point features picnic tables and grills available for visitor use. It also contains restrooms equipped with changing rooms and showers. Two snack bars are located on the beach, serving hamburgers, hotdogs, ice cream, and hot and cold beverages. Benches are situated around the Point.

The Old Greenwich Yacht Club is housed on the westward side of the Point. Membership in the nonprofit boating and sailing club is available to all Greenwich residents.

Town residents can arrange to moor their boats at the Point through the Department of Parks & Recreation Marine Division at Town Hall.

The Bruce Museum Seaside Center is open at Innis Arden Cottage during the summer months. The center serves to educate visitors about the ecology of Long Island Sound through a live-animal marine touch tank, four marine aquaria of local species, seashore dioramas of local species, and environmental activities and video presentations.

== See also ==
- National Register of Historic Places listings in Greenwich, Connecticut
