= Foxfire (1955 film) =

1955 American film

- Theatrical release poster
- Directed by: Joseph Pevney
- Screenplay by: Ketti Frings
- Based on: Foxfire by Anya Seton
- Produced by: Aaron Rosenberg
- Starring: Jane Russell; Jeff Chandler; Dan Duryea
- Cinematography: William H. Daniels
- Edited by: Ted J. Kent
- Music by: Frank Skinner
- Color process: Three-strip Technicolor
- Production company: Universal International Pictures
- Distributed by: Universal Pictures
- Release date: August 23, 1955
- Running time: 92 minutes
- Country: United States
- Language: English
- Box office: $1.9 million (US rentals)

Foxfire is a 1955 American drama romance Western film released by Universal-International, directed by Joseph Pevney, and starring Jane Russell, Jeff Chandler, and Dan Duryea. The movie was loosely based on a best-selling 1950 novel by Anya Seton.

Foxfire is historically notable in that it was the last American film to be shot in three-strip Technicolor, a process that had been supplanted by the coarser-grained and less chromatically saturated, but much cheaper, Eastmancolor single-strip process.

== Plot ==
After her car breaks down in the Arizona desert, New York socialite Amanda Lawrence accepts a ride from Jonathan Dartland, a mining engineer, and his friend Hugh Slater, a doctor with a penchant for liquor. Invited to a party hosted by her wealthy mother at the resort where they are staying, "Dart" claims to dislike mothers, especially those of spoiled beautiful daughters, but he and Amanda fall in love and quickly marry. Amanda's mother is not pleased to hear that Dart's mother is an Apache Indian princess, once married to a Boston college professor, who has taken back her Apache name and never sees her son.

Dart works in the mining community of Lodestone for Tyson Copper, where women are not welcome because of miners' superstitions, but wants to re-open the abandoned "foxfire" shaft, where he hopes to find a legendary vein of gold. Amanda adjusts easily to the rustic living conditions of Lodestone, and to the meddling opinions of the wife of the mine superintendent Jim Mablett, but feels devalued when Dart apparently does not want children. When his attention is completely occupied trying to get the foxfire project going, she innocently spends time with Hugh, who makes no secret to others that he is still attracted to Amanda, causing gossip in town begun by the jealous Maria, Hugh's nurse.

Dart is reticent about his background and ambitions. A pregnant Amanda opens a footlocker he mysteriously keeps locked, learning more about Dart's background. Dart resents the intrusion, believing she did so only out of bored amusement. Trying to win his trust, Amanda persuades the reluctant company owner, Mr. Tyson, to back Dart's foxfire project but this also backfires when Dart's pride is injured. She seeks out his mother, who explains her son's cultural attitudes, which include a belief that love is only temporary and that fathers do not acknowledge sons until they come of age and abandon their mothers. Dart has heard the rumors and misdirected by Maria, believes she is having a tryst with Hugh. When she returns, he is intoxicated and accuses her of being unfaithful. After she explains, he is contrite but they continue at cross purposes when she angrily rejects his drunken advances.

Amanda falls during a dizzy spell and has a miscarriage. Dart, unaware she was pregnant, tries to see her in the hospital but accedes to Hugh's dissuasion not to. Hurt by Dart's adherence to the "old ways" and telling him that he has treated her "like a squaw," Amanda intends to return home with her mother. At the foxfire shaft, which legend has is on ground sacred to the Apaches, many of them refuse to continue working after one of them has a seizure. Dart goes into the shaft to overcome their superstitions. It collapses and injures his hands, but he also finds the vein of gold. Informed at the airport by Maria that he's been hurt, Amanda rushes back, where Dart admits that the mine collapse showed him that he needs her and is no longer afraid of love. At the mine a new "Foxfire Gold Company" sign is erected.

== Cast ==
- Jane Russell as Amanda
- Jeff Chandler as Jonathan Dartland
- Dan Duryea as Hugh Slater
- Mara Corday as Maria
- Barton MacLane as Mr. Mablett
- Frieda Inescort as Mrs. Lawrence
- Celia Lovsky as Saba
- Eddy Waller as Old Larky (as Eddy C. Waller)
- Robert F. Simon as Ernest Tyson
- Charlotte Wynters as Mrs. Mablett
- Robert Bice as Walt Whiteman
- Arthur Space as Foley

== Production ==
=== Original novel ===
The film was based on a 1950 novel by Anya Seton, who had family members involved with mining and researched the novel's setting by spending time in Gila County, Arizona, visiting gold mines and spending time in an Indian reservation.

Film rights were bought by Universal in July 1953.

=== Script adaptation ===
Though Seton's novel takes place during the Great Depression and Prohibition era, the film's script is set in contemporary times. The film retained most of the novel's characters, locations and many plot events but substantially reworked the storyline. Villains intrinsic to the original story were eliminated, as was a melodramatic quest by three embittered treasure seekers for a Lost Dutchman's Gold Mine. The main characters' motivations and emotional responses were significantly altered.

=== Casting ===
In July 1953, Universal-International announced that June Allyson, who matched Seton's description of her heroine, would co-star with Jeff Chandler in a film adaptation of the novel, with filming slated to begin in April 1954.

Filming was pushed back as Allyson dropped out and Jane Russell was offered the lead role. Russell was paid $200,000 and was granted the right to employ Chandler for a future film for her own production company.

Chandler described the role as one of his favorites as "I don't have to be so darned monosyllabic in this one."

Linda Christian was to play the role of the girl in love with Chandler, but Universal decided to cast her in another film and gave her part to Mara Corday.

=== Filming ===
Filming started on July 27, 1954, and ended in September, taking place at the Apple Valley Inn in Apple Valley, California and in Oatman, Arizona.

== Reception ==
A.H. Weiler of the New York Times said: "Jeff Chandler, who wrote the lyrics of the title tune, and who, we are told, sings it, does well by the role of the brooding, brawny and handsome engineer. Although his problems appear to be bigger than they actually are, he makes a fine, romantic figure of a man. Miss Russell, if the appraisal isn't redundant by now, is a fine figure of a woman in a variety of revealing gowns and negligees. Her cheerfully sincere efforts to make her marriage work are worthy of sympathy, but, all things considered, Mr. Chandler's acting rings truer."

Jack Moffitt of The Hollywood Reporter said: "...Jane Russell, as the wife, does some of the best work she has done to date," while Variety wrote: "Miss Russell is extremely likable in her breezy characterization, playing it with becoming naturalness." Saturday Review said: "[T]he [role of the] socialite, well played by Jane Russell is a surprising sensible girl ... Ketti Fring's script probes unusually deep in analyzing the position of women in an Apache tribe and their relationship to their men." Hazel Flynn of the Beverly Hills Daily Newsline said: "Jane here continues in the trend she has been following of late...that is, acting instead of just exhibiting her charms. She is really good in "Foxfire" as is Jeff Chandler as the Apache with whom she falls in love."

== Soundtrack ==
In June 1955, Decca Records released the film's theme, sung by Chandler, as a single. Billboard said of the release: "That very good movie actor, Jeff Chandler, sings pleasantly, albeit with little 'fire,' on the haunting theme from his new picture, Foxfire."

== Home media ==
On December 11, 2018, Foxfire was released on both DVD and Blu-ray for the first time in the United States by Kino International under its subsidiary Kino Lorber Studio Classics. Both formats present the film in its theatrical aspect ratio of 2:1 (the film was originally shot in the academy ratio at 1.37:1). Reviews of the Kino Lorber release were excellent and praised the performances of both Jane Russell and Jeff Chandler.

== See also ==
- List of American films of 1955
