= Katherine Swynford: The Story of John of Gaunt and his Scandalous Duchess =

Biography

- Author: Alison Weir
- Publication date: 2007

Katherine Swynford: The Story of John of Gaunt and his Scandalous Duchess is a biography of Katherine Swynford written by Alison Weir and published in 2007 in Great Britain by Jonathan Cape. In the US, the book is titled Mistress of the Monarchy: The Life of Katherine Swynford, Duchess of Lancaster.

Katherine Swynford was the longtime mistress and later the third wife of John of Gaunt, third surviving son of Edward III. Through their legitimized children, she became an ancestress of several royal dynasties. As Weir notes, "...no letter survives, no utterance of hers is recorded. None of her movable goods are extant...Her will is lost...She is famous but, paradoxically, she is little known."

Weir reconstructs her subject's history through entries in court and municipal records, the descriptions of chroniclers, including Thomas Walsingham and Froissart, and other sources. The list of primary sources alone occupies over seven pages. A full telling of Katherine's life emerges from these and from inferences based on the author's understanding of 14th-century England. The resulting portrait is necessarily veiled — John of Gaunt emerges more clearly than Katherine does — but enough is established to suggest that she was an intelligent and devoted companion and mother.

In an appendix, Weir briefly discusses the novel Katherine, by Anya Seton, which made the subject familiar to a broad reading public and remains an extremely popular example of historical fiction.

== Reception ==
The book received a positive review from Kirkus. A Publishers Weekly review called it a "well-researched, engrossing and perceptive biography".
