= Foxfire (novel) =

Novel by Anya Seton

- Author: Anya Seton
- Language: English
- Genre: Western
- Published: 1951 (Houghton Mifflin)
- Pages: 346
- OCLC: 12626782

Foxfire is a 1951 novel by Anya Seton. It was published by Houghton Mifflin. It was adapted as the 1955 film Foxfire starring Jane Russell, Jeff Chandler, and Dan Duryea.

== Plot ==
In 1933, Amanda Lawrence is a socialite living in New York City. Her father died several years ago, leaving Amanda unable to finish studying at university. Then she meets a partly-Apache mining engineer named Jonathan Dartland, who is returning home after working in South Africa. Amanda and Jonathan fall in love and get married. They move to Lodestone, Arizona, where Jonathan (known as "Dart") works in the Shamrock Mine as mine foreman.

Though madly in love with Dart, Amanda despises living in poverty and often feels bored and lonely, as the other women in town shun her for living lavishly. At work, Dart faces troubles of his own, as he and the mine superintendent often have different views. Amanda's family back home recommend she divorce Dart and marry her wealthy ex-boyfriend. Throughout all these troubles, Amanda finds a friend in Hugh, a drunken doctor.

As Amanda and Dart's marriage begins to strain, Amanda hears an Apache legend of an Indian village discovered by two priests. In the village, the priests found a cave with a wall of gold in the back. The priests went mad after their discovery and one was killed by Indians; the other died shortly after. The village—and thus the gold mine—was lost, though Dart's father created a map to find it.

Hoping that finding the mine and collecting the gold inside will make her and Dart enough money to leave Lodestone and fix the cracks in their marriage, Amanda explains her idea to Dart. However, Dart believes that the story is simply a legend. It is not until Dart loses his job after the death of a fellow miner is blamed on him that he, Amanda, and Hugh set out to find the mine. A marvelous adventure ensues, during which Amanda and Dart both learn that there is a treasure more valuable than anything else: love.

== Background ==
Seton was known for the large amounts of research that went into her novels. As a child, she spent much time on her father's Arizona ranch.

== Reception ==
Foxfire was a New York Times bestseller, peaking at #6.

The Washington Post called it a "workmanlike piece of story-telling that expertly integrates romance with color and suspense, a combination hard to beat for popularity."

Elizabeth Watts of The Boston Globe wrote that Foxfire was better than Seton's previous novel, The Turquoise. Mary Bosworth Hobbs of The Birmingham News said it matched Seton's previous works and was possibly superior in maturity of theme.

== Film adaption ==
The novel was adapted into a film directed by Joseph Pevney starring Jane Russell, Jeff Chandler, and Dan Duryea. It released in 1955.
