= Smouldering Fires =

Smouldering Fires may refer to:

- Smouldering Fires (novel), novel by Anya Seton
- Smouldering Fires (film), 1925 silent film
