= The Winthrop Woman =

1958 novel by Anya Seton

First UK edition (publ. Hodder & Staughton)

The Winthrop Woman is Anya Seton's 1958 historical novel about Elizabeth Fones, a settler of the Massachusetts Bay Colony and a founder of Greenwich, Connecticut.

== Plot summary ==
The Winthrop Woman begins with young Elizabeth Fones and her family travelling to visit their family at their grandfather's countryside estate. Elizabeth's uncle, John Winthrop, is especially pious and strict about Protestantism; and he chides his sister for not taking proper care of her children, Elizabeth in particular, who is hot-headed and capricious. Elizabeth is caught blaspheming and is beaten, resulting in her becoming areligious and instilling in her a hatred for her uncle.

Years later, Elizabeth Fones has become a beautiful young woman working in her ailing father's apothecary. Though she is in love with her cousin John ("Jack") Winthrop Jr., it is Jack's friend Edward Howes who seeks to marry her. Just as she becomes engaged to Howes, her cousin Henry Winthrop (or "Harry"), Jack's younger brother, returns from his adventures in Barbados. Unlike his father and brother, Harry is wild and carefree, reckless to the point that he has depleted all his money and nearly brought his family to financial ruin. Unwilling to return to his father, Harry instead stays at Thomas Fones's house and spends his time frolicking with his equally profligate friends. One night, Harry and Elizabeth spend an especially long night out, their lust overcomes them, and they sleep together in a garden. In yet another reckless act, Harry declares that he is in love with Elizabeth and demands her hand in marriage.

The couple are wed, much to the dismay of both fathers (John Winthrop both believes that his son could do better than a Fones and is not fond of Elizabeth; Thomas Fones is dismayed because his daughter was already engaged to marry Edward Howes). Elizabeth and Harry move to the Winthrop estate in the countryside (John Winthrop no longer resides there as he has taken a position elsewhere). For a while, the couple live a happy life. However, it soon becomes obvious just how profligate Harry is as he neglects his wife and family to have his own fun. In the meantime, Jack returns. It is apparent that he and Elizabeth still have strong feelings for each other; but, while attempting to cover his feelings for his brother's wife, Jack accidentally kisses Martha, Elizabeth's younger sister, and soon the two are wed.

Finally, in an attempt to control his son, John Winthrop forces Harry to come to New England with him. In a final act of recklessness, Harry drowns when he attempts to jump in and swim. Elizabeth is left a pregnant widow. After she gives birth to her daughter (Martha), she, Jack, Martha, and John Winthrop's wife, Margaret, all depart for Massachusetts.

In the strict colony in the New World, Elizabeth runs into more trouble than ever. On her uncle's suggestion, Elizabeth marries Robert Feake, a weak-willed and strangely disturbed man who often has nightmares and commits odd deeds in his sleep. She also attempts to befriend Anne Hutchinson and chooses a tainted Indian woman, Telaka, for her maid. Eventually, Elizabeth and Robert are driven out of their house in Watertown because the other colonists believe Telaka to be a witch. The Feakes then settle in Greenwich in the colony of New Haven. After run-ins with Indians, Elizabeth and the other leader of the town, Daniel Patrick, join Greenwich to the Dutch colony of New Netherland. After Daniel Patrick is murdered by an old enemy, Elizabeth's husband, Robert, becomes completely mad and attempts to return to England. Meanwhile, Joan marries Thomas Lyons, who turns out to be a prospective gold-digger. When William Hallet, a previous acquaintance of Elizabeth's, begins courting her and gains more and more control over the Feake household, Lyons grows jealous. Finally, Elizabeth and her lover are accused of adultery after not having married properly under English law, and all their lands are confiscated. Elizabeth and William Hallet hide under the protection of Jack Winthrop, who is now an important member of another town in Connecticut. After Jack does everything that he can for his cousin and ex-lover, Elizabeth and William Hallet are once again free to move back to Greenwich, where Indians then set their house afire. Elizabeth and William Hallet have no choice but to start anew once more, their hearts heavy but their wills strengthened.

== Reception ==
Kirkus Reviews described it as "an absorbing story, in which the happenings grow out of the characters -- all too rare an attribute when the author is bound by integrity to historical fact".

== Subsequent editions ==
Philippa Gregory wrote a foreword for the 2006 edition.

A 2014 audiobook read by Corrie James received a starred review from Library Journal.
