= Henry Winthrop =

Henry Winthrop (1608–1630) was the second son of John Winthrop, founder and Governor of the Massachusetts Bay Colony. In addition to his taking part in his father's Great Migration to America in 1630, Henry is part of American history for being the first husband of Elizabeth Fones, who would later be a founding settler of what is now Greenwich, Connecticut, but also be at the center of scandal in colonial America, as captured in the popular novel, The Winthrop Woman.

== Early life ==
Henry was born on 10 January 1608 at Great Stambridge, England, with the christening on 20 January 1608 at the Winthrop home, Groton Manor, in Suffolk. Growing up, Henry split his time between Groton and London.

As a young man, he was described as "a spritely and hopeful young gentleman." Though well-to-do in his own right through inheritances, Henry tried one major business venture, traveling to live in Barbados to start a tobacco plantation, but he was not successful.

To the dismay of his family, upon return from Barbados in 1629 he entered a whirlwind courtship with his first cousin Elizabeth Fones, daughter of his aunt Anne Winthrop, sister of Henry's father John Winthrop. Elizabeth Fones had been born at Groton Manor on 21 January 1610 to Anne and Thomas Fones, a London apothecary and a staunch Puritan. Henry and "Bess" were married on 25 April 1629, at the Church of St. Sepulchre at New Gate, London.

== To the New World ==
Eleven months after the marriage, Henry's father's flotilla of ships—the Winthrop Fleet—sailed west to create a "City on a Hill" in what would become the Massachusetts Bay Colony. "From John Winthrop's adult family, only Henry would sail in April 1630." Henry was supposed to be in his father's lead ship, the Arbella, but he missed boarding due to helping to corral a herd of cattle. Henry left a few days later aboard the ship Talbot, leaving his young bride behind in England on account of her pregnancy. Henry's baby, a daughter named Martha Johanna Winthrop, was born on 9 May 1630 at Groton Manor, while Henry was at sea. Because of what would transpire in the new world, Henry would not live to see his daughter.

The Talbot arrived at the Massachusetts Bay Colony on 1 July 1630. The next day, Henry was part of a group exploring near the Colony when they spied a native canoe on the opposite side of a river. Being the only one in the group who could swim, Henry volunteered to swim across but en route he was "seized with cramps and went down. Those standing on the shore had no means of going to his assistance. So died Henry Winthrop in his twenty-third year." As one historian noted, "The wanderer had found his last resting place."

An anguished Gov. John Winthrop, in a letter to his wife to report the tragic news, referred to "My son Henry, my son Henry, ah my poor child."

== Family Line ==
With infant daughter Martha Johanna Winthrop in tow, Henry's widow Elizabeth sailed to the Massachusetts Bay Colony aboard the Lyon, arriving on 2 November 1631. The widow and child were taken under the care of her father-in-law (and uncle), Governor John Winthrop.

Elizabeth would marry again to Lt. Robert Feake, and in the early 1640s, would move to an extensive property they acquired in Connecticut, encompassing what is now called Old Greenwich. There, their daughter Martha would meet and marry Thomas Lyon, whose family home, the Thomas Lyon House, is on the National Register of Historic Places. Martha and Thomas Lyon had one child, a daughter, Mary Lyon, born August 1649. Mary married John Willson "of Bedford, afterward of Rye," so their children continued the line of direct descent from Henry Winthrop in the American colonies.

Henry's widow Elizabeth would marry for a third time, to William Hallet, who was Lt. Feake's business manager. As Lt. Feake was still alive, and there was no proof of a divorce, scandal and the threat of legal action encouraged the Hallets to move to the more tolerant colony of New Amsterdam, settling in Queens, N.Y., where Elizabeth (Fones) Winthrop Feake Hallett died ca 1670.
