= Smouldering Fires (novel) =

1975 novel by Anya Seton

First edition

Smouldering Fires is a historical novel by Anya Seton. It was published by Doubleday, New York, NY, U.S.A., 1975.

This book covers reincarnation and past lives regression and shares some of the territory the author covered in her best selling novel, Green Darkness.

== Plot introduction ==
A teenage girl is troubled by dreams and fantasies that parallel the life of another girl who lived over 200 years before.

The book revolves around a young New Englander, Amy Delatour, a teenager of French Acadian-English lineage, who often goes into a fugue state where she believes she is a tormented soul named Ange-Marie, a French Acadian in exile in eighteenth century Connecticut who had been separated from her beloved husband, Paul. The shy and bookish Amy lives in a state of anguish and uncertainty, until one of her high school teachers, Martin Stone, takes an interest in this unusual, highly intelligent young woman. Together they try to get to the bottom of her mysterious dream states and her fire phobia.

== Reception ==
Smouldering Fires received a critical review from Kirkus Reviews. It read, "Best leave the whole smoldering pile to burn itself out".
