= Feake–Ferris House =

American historic structure

Coordinates: 41°01′03″N 73°33′57″W

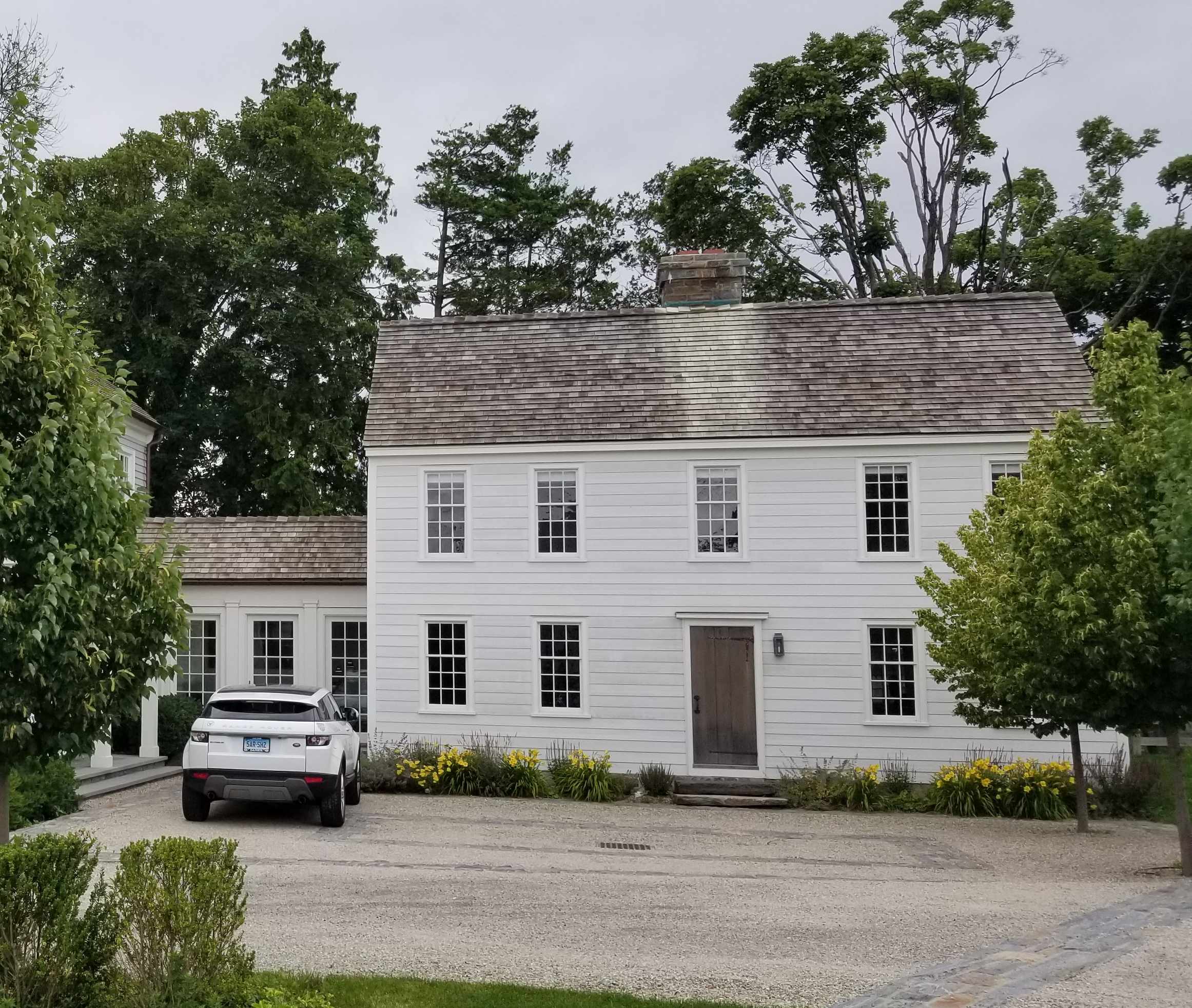
Feake–Ferris House in 2021 after restoration

The Feake–Ferris House (also known as the Ross Ferris House) is a historic structure at 181 Shore Road in Old Greenwich, Connecticut, and is the oldest house in Greenwich. It was built as a “one-over one” house around 1645, and in 1689 was expanded to its present “two-over- two” saltbox shape.

== History ==
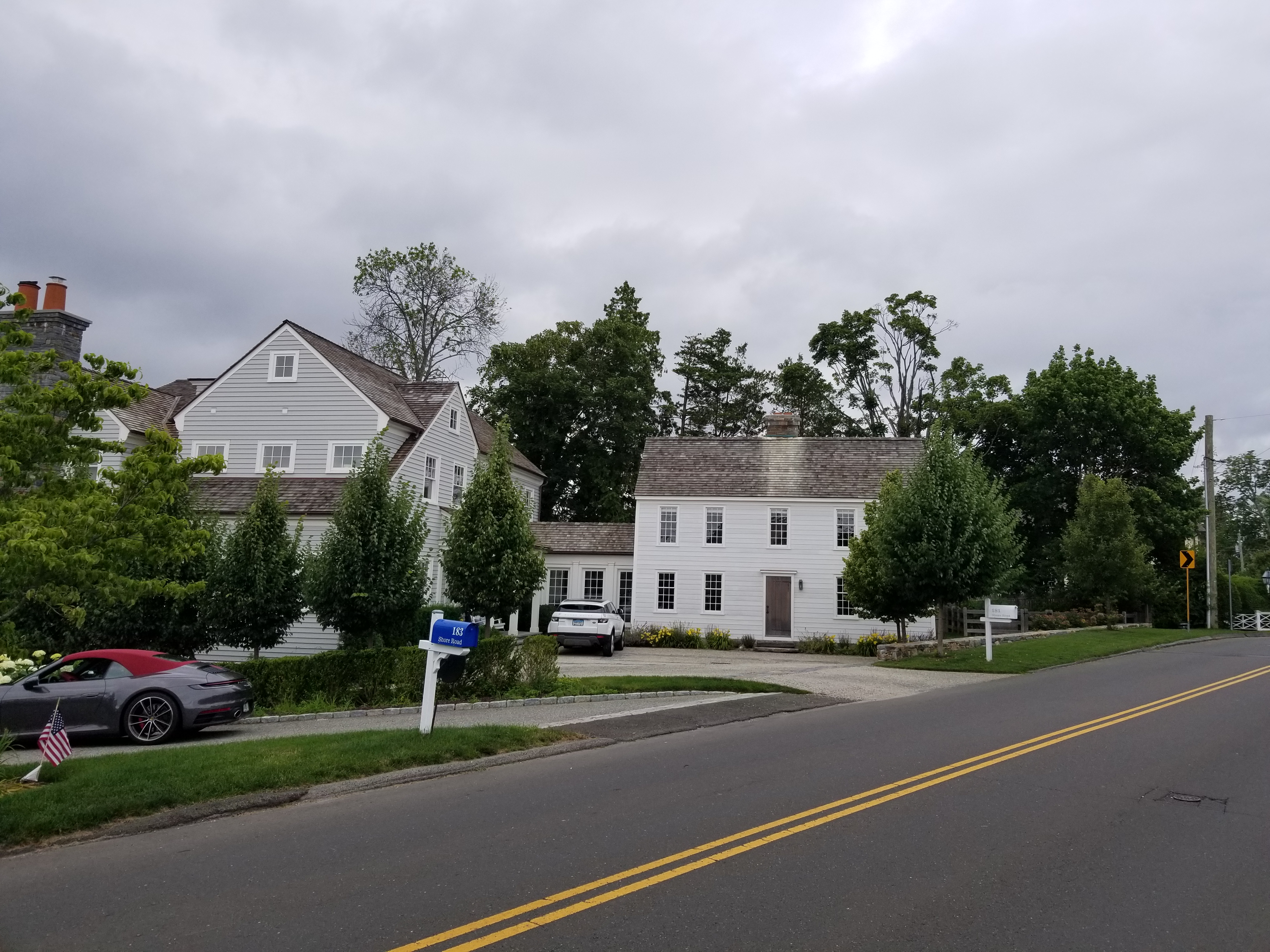
Feake–Ferris House (right) and modern addition (left)

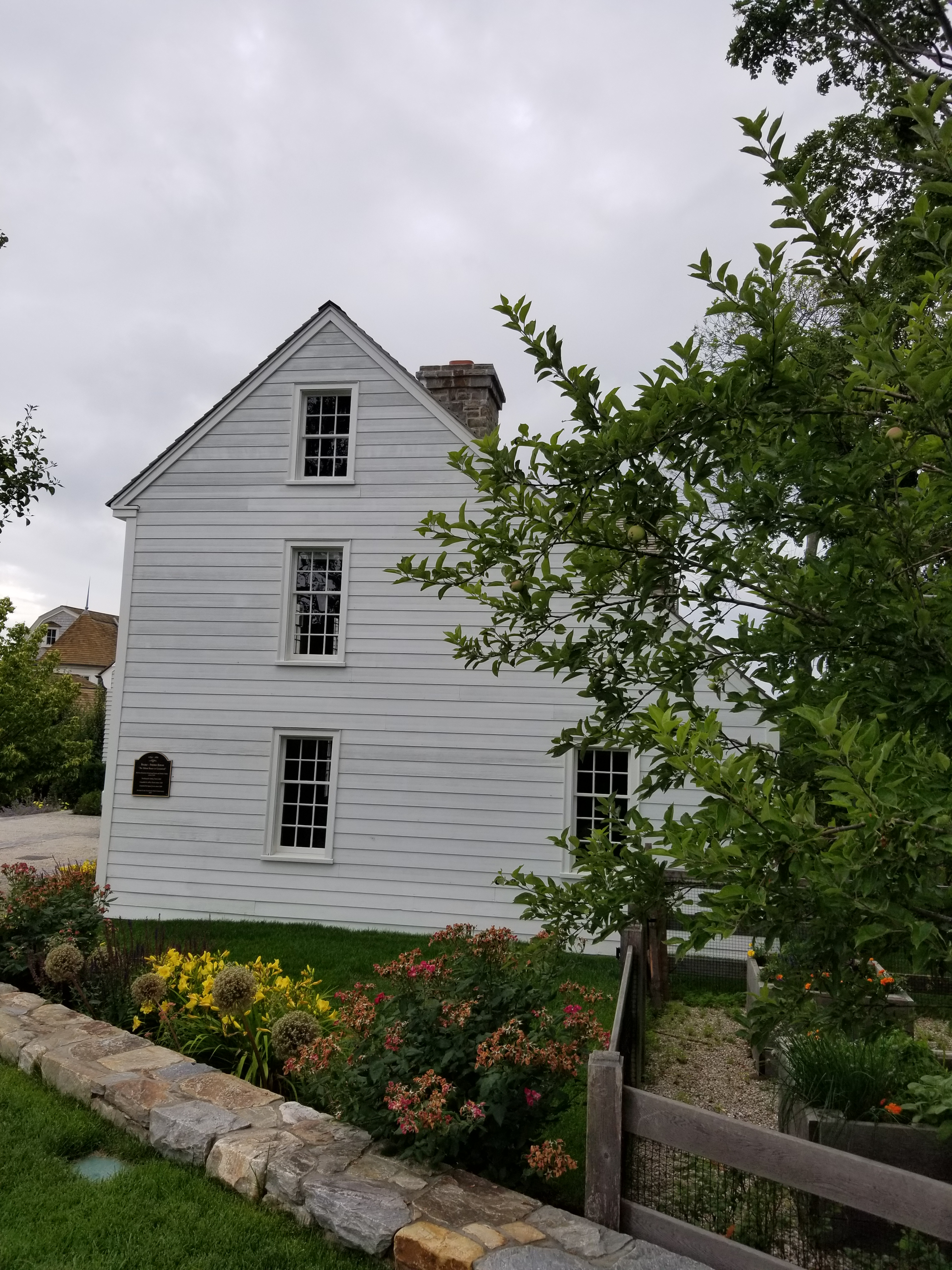
Recreated period gardens on the side of the home

In 1640, Elizabeth Fones and Lt. Robert Feake purchased Greenwich Point from local Indians. The Feakes began with a fieldstone cellar, which is intact today, dug into a hill overlooking Greenwich Cove, which served as a makeshift home for their family. Around 1645, they constructed a post and beam house on top of the cellar. The Feakes later divorced, and Elizabeth sold the property to Jeffrey Ferris in 1653.

Around 1660, Ferris added a lean-to to the back of the house, giving it a saltbox shape. In 1689, Ferris's son James constructed the final major addition to the right side of house, leaving it with a two-over-two form and an extended lean-to. Ferris also installed new windows, one of which has survived intact and was discovered during the 2018 restoration. It is one of the earliest surviving two-sash windows in America.

The Ferris family owned the house for several centuries. Jeffrey's great-grandson James was a Revolutionary War veteran in the Battle of White Plains (1776), and he owned the house during the war. Some believe the house suffered damage during the war from British cannon fire. James' daughter Hannah inherited the house in the early 1800s.

By the mid-1800s, Ammi Roswell Ferris (1837–1914) owned the house and ran a tollgate at the causeway to Greenwich Point, collecting "a toll from people who were going to gather scallops and clams at Greenwich Point." In 1951, Laura M. Boles and Bertha Boles acquired the property, and Laura Boles's executors sold the house in 1968 to Elizabeth F. Slater.

In 1971, Slater sold it to the Lueder family who owned the house for nearly 40 years before selling it to the Waters family.

== Preservation ==
The dilapidated house was nearly demolished in 2014 and replaced with a newer building before its age was discovered, but its history was uncovered and the demolition process came to a halt. The Greenwich Point Conservancy determined the house's age using dendrochronology and record research, and they restored the house in 2018, working together with the Waters family, who also constructed a large addition adjacent to the original structure. The house remains privately owned, but it is open to the public once a year by an agreement with the Greenwich Point Conservancy. The entire post and beam structure from the c1689 expansion of the house remains fully intact, as well as the floors, ceilings, walls/ paneling and other historical features, such as the original strap hinges on the front door of the house. The house also retains one of its original c1689 double-hung windows with its original glass, which had been encapsulated within one of the walls for over 200 years. That window was used to make new historically-correct windows during the 2018 restoration. The Feake-Ferris house is essentially unaltered from its c1689 condition, with the exception of the central chimney stack with had been removed around 1900 but was rebuilt in its original design during the 2018 restoration.

The house was tested by dendrochronologists at Columbia University's Lamont–Doherty Earth Observatory. The Greenwich Point Conservancy (GPC) commissioned the study, which showed that the west side of the house dates to around 1645, the north lean-to addition to around 1660, and the east side and expansion of the lean-to to around 1689. According to the Conservancy, the outermost rings of one summer beam dated to 1610, but the precise date of the beam is unknown due to the lack of sapwood in the sample - but it is possible it dates to Greenwich’s founding in 1640, . Historian Missy Wolf researched the land's title history dating back to Feake.

== See also ==
- Elizabeth Fones
- List of the oldest buildings in Connecticut
