= Amy Flagg =

British historian and photographer

Amy Cecilia Flagg (30 September 1893 – 22 February 1965) was a British historian and photographer.

== Biography ==
Flagg was born in South Shields (then part of County Durham) on 30 September 1893 and lived in Westoe. She was the town historian of South Shields and spent years of her life researching and documenting the town. She was a member of the South Shields Photographic Society, joining in 1930 and was the official photographer of the town during the Second World War: she captured images of air raid damage to the town. She even reported on the destruction of her own home during an air raid on April 16, 1941.

Flagg photographed with a Box Brownie camera and processed all the images herself. Some of her photographs were published by the Shields Gazette during the war. Flagg later became a volunteer at Ingham Infirmary and South Shields Public Library. Her collection was donated to the South Tyneside Library after her death on 22 February 1965. She also left a substantial sum of money to the infirmary.

== Recognition and commemoration ==
At the end of Anya Seton's 1962 novel Devil Water (featuring James, the Earl of Derwentwater and his involvement with the Jacobite rising of 1715) she thanks Flagg: "My greatest debt of all is to Miss Amy C. Flagg of Westoe, South Shields, Durham, in England. She is my dear friend and kinswoman: she is above all an indefatigable sleuth. For her researchers through the years, for the masses of specialised material which she has patiently copied for me, for her constant encouragement when I've been with her, and by letter when I haven't - for all this my fervent gratitude is but sparse return".

A watercolour painting of Flagg, by Albert E. Black in 1955, shows her in a long brown coat and carrying a basket of flowers and an easel; it is in the collection of Tyne and Wear Museums.

An exhibition of her photography works was held at the South Shields Public Library in 1969.

Flagg was nominated to be commemorated by a blue plaque at her former home Chapel House, Westoe. The plaque was due for installation in 2021 but was delayed by the Covid pandemic and was unveiled by the Mayor of South Tyneside on International Women's Day 8 March 2022.

== Publications ==
- Flagg, A.C. 1953. "The water supply of South Shields before 1952", Proceedings of the Society of Antiquaries of Newcastle upon Tyne (5th Series, I, Number 5), 186–189.
- Flagg, A.C. 1964. History of Westoe Village.
- Flagg, A.C. 1979 (posthumously). The History of Shipbuilding in South Shields 1746-1946.
