= The Mistletoe and Sword =

1955 novel by Anya Seton

- Author: Anya Seton
- Language: English
- Genre: Historical fiction
- Published: 1955 (Doubleday)
- Publication place: United States
- Pages: 253

The Mistletoe and Sword: A Story of Roman Britain is a 1955 young adult novel of historical fiction by Anya Seton.

== Plot ==
Quintus Tullius is a standard bearer for the Ninth Roman legion who wishes to find and bury the bones of his long-dead grandfather. While in Britain, he meets and falls in love with Regan, the foster daughter of the warrior queen of the Iceanians who leads the British tribes in the uprising against Rome.

== Reception ==
Ellen Lewis Buell in The New York Times wrote, "Here Miss Seton is at her best, drawing the country and its people out of the mists of two millennia into clear focus."

It was also reviewed in Kirkus Reviews.
