= The Six Wives of Henry VIII (book) =

1991 nonfiction book about Henry VIII's marriages, written by Alison Weir

- Title page for The Six Wives of Henry VIII (1992)
- Author: Alison Weir
- Language: English
- Subject: Wives of Henry VIII
- Genre: Non-fiction
- Publication date: 1991
- Publication place: United Kingdom

The Six Wives of Henry VIII is a 1991 history book, an account of Henry VIII's marriages by British historian Alison Weir.

The book was Weir's first historical work since her first book, Britain's Royal Families. It is divided into three sections - "Catherine of Aragon," "The Great Matter" and "How many wives will he have?"
