= Thomas Lyon House =

Historic house in Connecticut, United States

- U.S. National Register of Historic Places
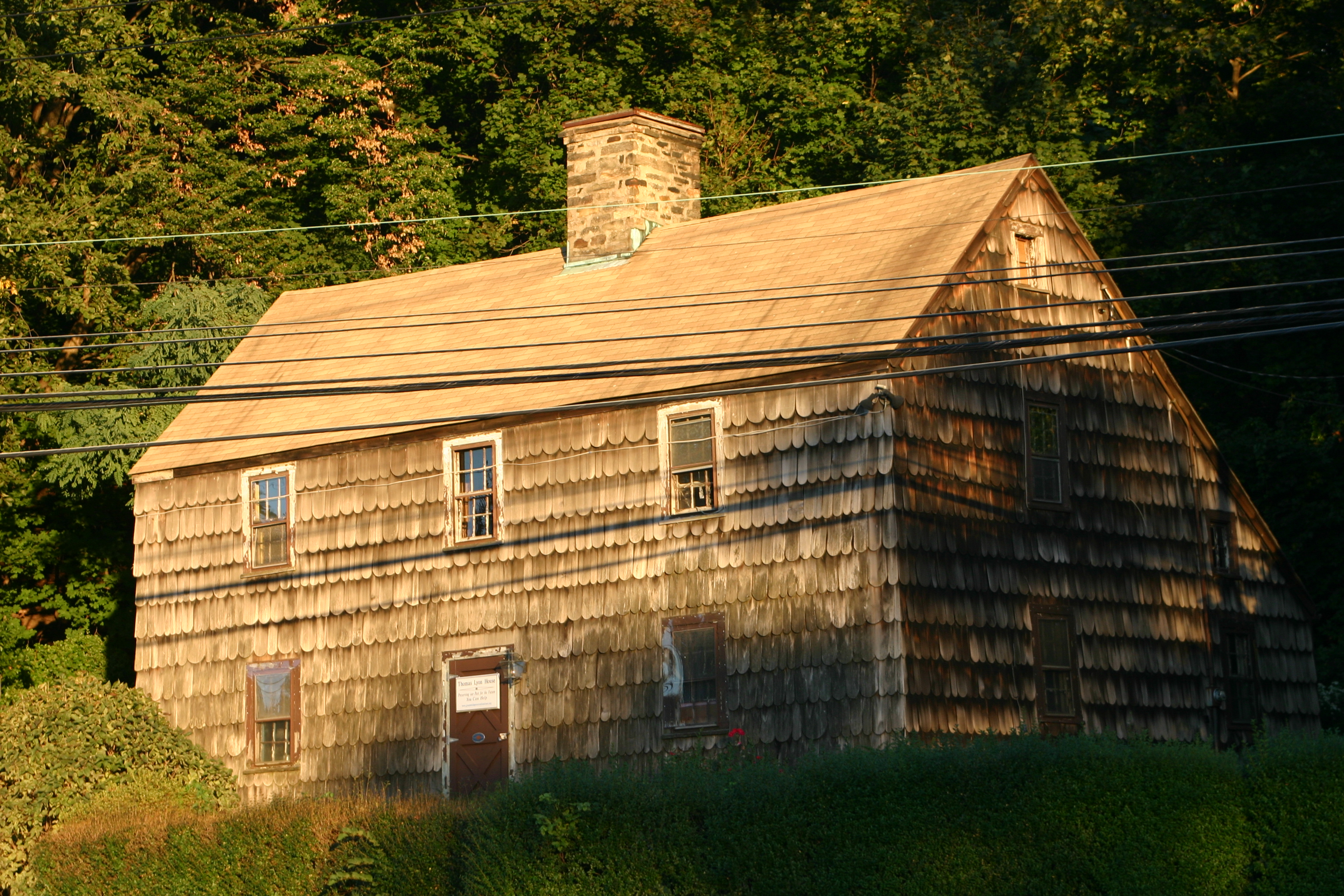

- Location within Connecticut
- Location: West Putnam Avenue and Byram Road, Greenwich, Connecticut
- Coordinates: 41°0′52″N 73°39′16″W
- Built: 1739
- Architectural style: Colonial
- NRHP reference No.: 77001390
- Added to NRHP: August 24, 1977

The Thomas Lyon House, at 1 Byram Road, was built ca. 1739 and is one of the oldest structures in Greenwich, Connecticut. The restoration of the house, a Colonial saltbox, is the primary project of the Greenwich Preservation Trust, a not-for-profit organization that grew out of the Thomas Lyon House Committee formed by the Byram Neighborhood Association. Its heritage dates back to the family of Thomas Lyon (1621–1690), one of the earliest settlers of Fairfield County, and particularly his son, Thomas Lyon (1673–1739) who, with his wife Abigail and their children, were the initial occupants. The house stayed in the family line of Abigail and Thomas Lyon in to the 20th century.

== Thomas Lyon (1621–1690) ==
The first Thomas Lyon was born in England about 1621. He is reported to have come first to the Massachusetts Colony, and thence to have gone to seek his fortune in the 'far west' of Fairfield County, CT.

His first wife was Martha Johanna Winthrop, the only child of Elizabeth Fones Winthrop and her husband Henry Winthrop, second son of Governor John Winthrop of the Massachusetts Bay Colony. Martha had been born May 9, 1630 at Groton Manor, the Winthrop home in England, and as an infant sailed to the Massachusetts Bay Colony with her mother, arriving November 2, 1631. In the early 1640s, the young Martha moved with her parents to their newly acquired property encompassing the area known now as Old Greenwich in Fairfield County, CT. Martha married Thomas Lyon circa 1647, and they had one child, Mary Lyon, born August 1649. Having battled frail health for some years, Martha (Winthrop) Lyon died in her early twenties, likely in 1653. Thomas Lyon remarried in 1654 to Mary Hoyt, daughter of Simon Hoyt of Stamford, CT. This Thomas Lyon died in Greenwich in 1690, and was buried in the old Lyon family burying ground at Byram Neck. His will left extensive land holdings in the area to his children, including his son Thomas Lyon.

== Thomas Lyon (1673–1739) ==
Thomas Lyon was born in 1673 to Thomas Lyon and his second wife, Mary Hoyt. This younger Thomas Lyon married Abigail Ogden, daughter of Judith (Budd) and John Ogden. This Thomas Lyon "built the house near Byram Bridge, which is still standing, having been occupied until the present time [1907] by his descendants." In 1711, Thomas Lyon was called into short-term military service on the Canada–US border as a member of Col. Robert Hunter's Company of Fusiliers. This Thomas Lyon died in April, 1739, with his will proven May 1 of that year. His wife, Abigail (Ogden) Lyon, lived until 1760; ownership of the house went to the next generation in their family.

== Sources ==
It is to two sources that we are indebted for much of the knowledge we have of the life and descendants of Thomas Lyon (1621–1690): 1) Robert Charles Winthrop, a lineal descendant of Governor John Winthrop, who in 1891 published a number of letters found among the papers of Governor Winthrop, written by Thomas Lyon, his wife Martha (Winthrop) Lyon, and other members of the family. and 2) Robert B. Miller, who edited the 1907 book Lyon Memorial which gives additional background on Thomas Lyon (#1) as well as detailed genealogical information on his descendants, including is son, Thomas Lyon, of the Thomas Lyon House.

== See also ==
- List of the oldest buildings in Connecticut
- National Register of Historic Places listings in Fairfield County, Connecticut
