= Devil Water =

1962 historical novel by Anya Seton

- Author: Anya Seton
- Language: English
- Genre: Historical fiction
- Published: 1962 (Houghton Mifflin)
- Pages: 526
- OCLC: 1035940873

Devil Water is a 1962 historical novel by Anya Seton.

A 2007 edition features a foreword by Philippa Gregory.

== Plot ==
Charles Radcliffe escapes from Newgate Prison after his brother's execution during the Jacobite rising of 1715. Charles' daughter Jenny travels across the Atlantic Ocean to Williamsburg, Virginia and William Byrd's plantation.

== Reception ==
Robert Scholes in The New York Times Book Review wrote, "The author has missed, or perhaps deliberately avoided, opportunities for really exciting scenes[...] "When Miss Seton merely fictionalizes history, relying on the actual diaries of William Byrd of Virginia, or quoting verbatim letters of Byrd and the Earls of Derwentwater, she manages well. The embarrassing moments in the narrative come from her piecing out of the gaps inconveniently left by history."

Fanny Butcher wrote "mixed by Miss Seton's skillful hands, the dust of the past becomes the clay of the artist and is molded into memorable, lifelike form."

It was also reviewed by Kirkus Reviews.

Devil Water reached #5 on The New York Times Best Seller list.
