= Dragonwyck (film) =

1946 film by Joseph L. Mankiewicz

- Theatrical release poster
- Directed by: Joseph L. Mankiewicz
- Written by: Joseph L. Mankiewicz
- Based on: Dragonwyck by Anya Seton
- Produced by: Darryl F. Zanuck; Ernst Lubitsch (uncredited)
- Starring: Gene Tierney; Walter Huston; Vincent Price; Glenn Langan; Anne Revere; Spring Byington; Harry Morgan; Jessica Tandy; Connie Marshall
- Cinematography: Arthur C. Miller
- Edited by: Dorothy Spencer
- Music by: Alfred Newman
- Production company: 20th Century-Fox
- Distributed by: 20th Century-Fox
- Release date: April 10, 1946
- Running time: 103 minutes
- Country: United States
- Language: English
- Box office: $3 million (US rentals)

Dragonwyck is a 1946 American period drama film adapted from Anya Seton's novel Dragonwyck. Produced by Twentieth Century-Fox, it was adapted and directed by Joseph L. Mankiewicz, and produced by Darryl F. Zanuck and Ernst Lubitsch (uncredited). The film stars Gene Tierney, Walter Huston, Vincent Price, and Glenn Langan.

== Plot ==
In 1844 Greenwich, Connecticut, Miranda Wells, a farm girl raised by strait-laced low church parents Ephraim and Abigail, often daydreams of a romantic and luxurious life. Miranda's mother receives a letter from their distant cousin Nicholas Van Ryn, a wealthy patroon in Hudson, New York. Miranda persuades her parents to allow her travel to Nicholas' manor, Dragonwyck, to be a companion to his eight-year-old daughter, Katrine. Miranda gradually learns that Nicholas and his wife Johanna are estranged from each other and from their daughter. Servants claim the Van Ryn bloodline is cursed as only they can hear a harpsichord played by an ancestral ghost whenever misfortune befalls the family.

While secretly attending the tenant farmers' Kermesse with Katrine, Miranda meets Anti-Rent supporter, Dr. Jeff Turner. Miranda also witnesses Nicholas evicting farmer Klaas Bleecker for refusing to participate in the annual rent-paying ceremony. A few days later, Klaas is accused of murder. Nicholas grudgingly agrees to Turner's request that the farmer be given a fair trial, in return for which he insists the doctor attend to his ailing wife, Johanna. Although Johanna is diagnosed with a simple cold, she dies unexpectedly of acute gastritis after eating cake.

Nicholas tells Miranda he was unhappy that Johanna was unable to bear him a son after Katrine's birth left her unable to have more children. He also admits having romantic feelings for Miranda. She reciprocates his feelings, but returns to Greenwich. Two months later, Nicholas arrives and proposes marriage, to which Ephraim and Abigail reluctantly consent. Nicholas is thrilled when Miranda becomes pregnant soon after the wedding, but they quarrel over her simple faith in a God as the semi-feudal system of patroon land ownership and tenancy crumbles around him. When their infant son dies immediately after being baptized, a heartbroken and embittered Nicholas isolates himself in the attic and becomes a drug addict. Peg O'Malley, Miranda's loyal maid, fears for Miranda's life and calls upon Dr. Turner for help.

Turner arrives as Nicholas is suffering a psychotic episode characterized by auditory hallucinations. He realizes Nicholas fatally poisoned Johanna. Nicholas implies he is plotting Miranda's murder. He lunges at Turner, and the two brawl with the younger Turner ultimately knocking out Nicholas. Peggy spirits Miranda away for safety.

An increasingly volatile and dangerous Nicholas grabs a pistol and goes to the Kermesse grounds in an attempt to revive patroonal authority by restoring old rituals of tenancy. Turner arrives with the tenant farmers, the mayor, and the sheriff, to arrest Nicholas for his first wife's murder. When Nicholas reaches for his gun, he is fatally shot.

Turner sees Miranda off as she leaves for home. As they part, Turner, who previously attempted to court Miranda, asks to see her again. She agrees that he may.

== Cast ==
- Gene Tierney as Miranda Wells
- Vincent Price as Nicholas van Ryn
- Walter Huston as Ephraim Wells
- Glenn Langan as Dr. Jeff Turner
- Anne Revere as Abigail Wells
- Spring Byington as Magda
- Connie Marshall as Katrine Van Ryn
- Harry Morgan as Bleecker (credited as Henry Morgan)
- Jessica Tandy as Peggy
- Vivienne Osborne as Johanna Van Ryn
- Trudy Marshall as Elizabeth Van Borden
- Larry Steers as Servant (uncredited)
- Grady Sutton as Hotel Clerk (uncredited)

== Production ==
Darryl F. Zanuck had expressed interest in adapting Anya Seton's gothic romance novel Dragonwyck and assigned Joseph L. Mankiewicz to submit an appraisal. Mankiewicz wrote: "I think careful consideration of this [novel] will reveal less to this than meets the eye. The love story is apt to be very unsatisfying in its conclusion [...] The background is new, The opportunities for production values are exciting and the cost will be overwhelming!" Despite this negative appraisal, Twentieth Century-Fox acquired the screen rights to Seton's novel.

Zanuck assigned Ernst Lubitsch to direct the adaptation. However, Lubitsch collapsed from a heart attack while filming A Royal Scandal (1945). Lubitsch asked Mankiewicz to write the screenplay and direct the film, marking his feature film debut as a director. Mankiewicz—who had called Lubitsch his "friend, guide, and preceptor" since their time at Paramount Pictures—eagerly accepted the offer as he had recently vacated his producer's contract at MGM to work with Fox.

By the spring of 1944, Gregory Peck, Gene Tierney, and John Hodiak were cast in the leading roles. Peck dropped out to star in Duel in the Sun (1946) and was replaced by Vincent Price. Hodiak was replaced by Glenn Langan. Jessica Tandy was cast as Miranda's invalid Irish maid, after Mankiewicz had seen her performance in Tennessee Williams's one-act play Portrait of a Madonna directed by her husband Hume Cronyn.

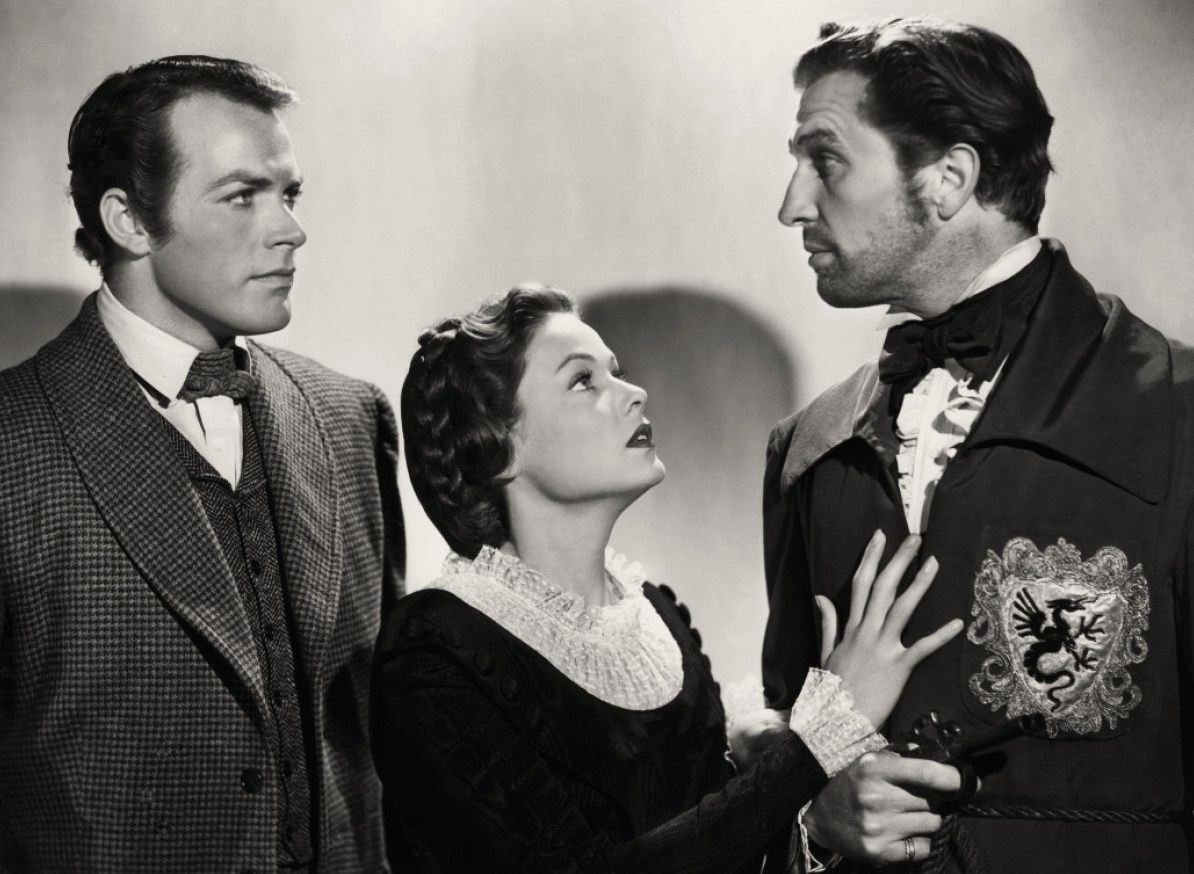
L–R: Glenn Langan, Gene Tierney, and Vincent Price in Dragonwyck

Principal photography began on February 12, 1945. While on the set, watching Mankiewicz direct, Lubitsch turned to Tierney and said: "What have I done? How could I give our picture to this novice? He knows nothing." Tierney, aware that Mankiewicz was a first-time director, responded that she felt the film was in good hands. Mankiewicz reflected, "We differed about some of the direction, mostly where to put the camera. I felt a little more inclined, since I was to be a director, to feel my oats a bit. I had Arthur Miller as my cameraman, who is just the best. Artie was very kind to me and side with me very often." Price, however, was impressed with Mankiewicz's direction, noting his "insight into character and story" would make him "one of the great directors."

After Mankiewicz shot a scene of Van Ryn berating Miranda in their bedroom, Lubitsch sent him an angry memo saying the character would have closed the door so the servants could not hear them. Mankiewicz acknowledged the error in retrospect, but by the end of filming, they were no longer on speaking terms. Lubitsch later withdrew from the production and had his producer's credit removed from the film. Eventually, he and Mankiewicz reconciled and remained close until Lubitsch's death in 1947.

The film's ending was rewritten during production. Originally, the film was to feature the destruction of the Dragonwyck estate, but the Production Code Administration (PCA) suggested it was too similar to previous gothic romantic films.

== Release ==
Dragonwyck premiered at the Roxy Theatre in New York City on April 10, 1946, and grossed $109,000 in its first week. The following week, it became the number one film in the United States after opening in Los Angeles, Chicago, Baltimore, Pittsburgh, St Louis and Seattle with a total of $277,000 for the week in the markets covered by Variety. By January 1947, the film had earned theatrical rentals of $3 million.

== Reception ==
Bosley Crowther of The New York Times wrote: "... Twentieth Century-Fox has fashioned a grand and gloomy mansion as the scene, and has inhabited it with a haughty master of aristocratic Dutch descent. ... Vincent Price gives a picturesque performance as the regal and godless patroon, using his face and his carriage to demonstrate insolence, that's all. Clean shaven and elegantly tailored, he still makes a formidable Bluebeard, and his moments of suave diabolism are about the best in the film. Gene Tierney is fairly ornamental in the role of the tortured child bride, but she plainly creates no more character than the meager script provides. Of the several lesser characters, Walter Huston is most credible as the forthright, God-fearing father of the cardboard heroine."

Variety wrote: "It's a psychological yarn, its mid-19th century American feudal background being always brooding with never a break in its flow of morbidity. Yet it is always interesting if somewhat too pointed at times in its fictional contrivance ...Gene Tierney plays the governess and it is one of her most sympathetic roles. Miss Tierney is photographed attractively, and paced well too, in the direction, as are all the others. Vincent Price is the psychiatrist Van Ryn. It is one of his best roles to date, and he handles for its all its worth." Harrison's Reports called Dragonwyck "doubtful entertainment for the masses" and it was "a psychological drama, and as such may prove of interest to intellectuals. But as far as the picture-goer of the rank and file is concerned, the action is too slow and draggy, and the plot tends to make him feel morbid."

Time magazine wrote: "Producer Ernst Lubitsch's sets are as lavish as Novelist Seton's story is lurid. Pretty Farm Girl Gene Tierney and Patroon Vincent Price play their parts as though James K. Polk were still in the White House and it all mattered."

On the review aggregator website Rotten Tomatoes, 67% of 6 critics' reviews are positive, with an average rating of 6.1/10.

== Adaptations to other media ==
Dragonwyck was adapted as an hour-long radio play on the October 7, 1946 broadcast of Lux Radio Theater, starring Vincent Price and Gene Tierney. It was dramatized as a half-hour radio play on the January 20, 1947, broadcast of The Screen Guild Theater, starring Vincent Price and Teresa Wright.

== Bibliography ==
- Eyman, Scott (1993). Ernst Lubitsch: Laughter in Paradise. New York: Simon & Schuster. ISBN 978-0-671-74936-1.
- Geist, Kenneth L. (1978). Pictures Will Talk: The Life and Films of Joseph L. Mankiewicz. New York: Scribners. ISBN 0-684-15500-1.
- Stern, Sydney Ladensohn (2019). The Brothers Mankiewicz: Hope, Heartbreak, and Hollywood Classics. University Press of Mississippi. ISBN 978-1-617-03267-7.
- Tierney, Gene; Herskowitz, Mickey (1979). Self-Portrait. Peter Wyden. ISBN 0-88326-152-9.
