= My Theodosia =

1941 novel by Anya Seton

- 1941 Grosset & Dunlap edition
- Author: Anya Seton
- Language: English
- Genre: Historical Romance
- Publisher: Houghton Mifflin
- Publication date: 1941
- Publication place: United States
- Media type: Print (Hardback & Paperback)
- Pages: 314 pp

My Theodosia is a novel written by the American author Anya Seton which was first published in 1941.

It is a fictional interpretation of the life of Theodosia Burr Alston, set against a historical background of Aaron Burr's Vice Presidency of the United States, and his subsequent years.

The book focuses on the life of Theodosia: her marriage to Joseph Alston; her suggested romance with Meriwether Lewis; and ultimately her unwavering devotion to her father Aaron Burr, and his devotion to her.

== Plot summary ==
The story begins on Theodosia's seventeenth birthday in the year 1800, where her father Aaron Burr introduces Theodosia to her soon to be husband Joseph Alston. Theodosia is not keen on her father's choice for a husband, for she does not realise that her father hopes the marriage will increase his political support in the southern states, as well as lead to financial gain. During Theodosia and Joseph's official courtship, by chance Theodosia meets Meriwether Lewis, and the two are instantly attracted to each other. However Aaron Burr spots the two together, and eliminates any chance of a romance before it begins.

Reluctantly but dutifully, Theodosia capitulates to her father's wishes and marries Joseph Alston in February 1801. The couple then settle in Joseph's home state of South Carolina, and Theodosia soon gives birth to her first and only child. However Theodosia is never happy in the South and constantly longs for the company of her father (and a reunification with Meriwether Lewis).

The story moves on through Aaron Burr's time as Vice President: his controversial actions dueling Alexander Hamilton; his working to take over Mexico, naming himself as king; and his subsequent trial. Theodosia is always behind her father, even if it is at the cost of her marriage to Joseph, and her romance with Meriwether.

== Reception ==
Kirkus Reviews noted, "The author, while making the most of her material, has managed to sustain an objective viewpoint towards her characters (at some sacrifice of the sympathy she might have claimed)".

Though reviewers frequently comment on the meticulous research Seton put into her books, Richard N. Cote claims there are historical inaccuracies with My Theodosia. Both the putative romance with Meriwether Lewis and the depiction of the Alston marriage as unhappy are examples of fiction, not fact.
