= Robert Feake =

New England settler (1602-1661)

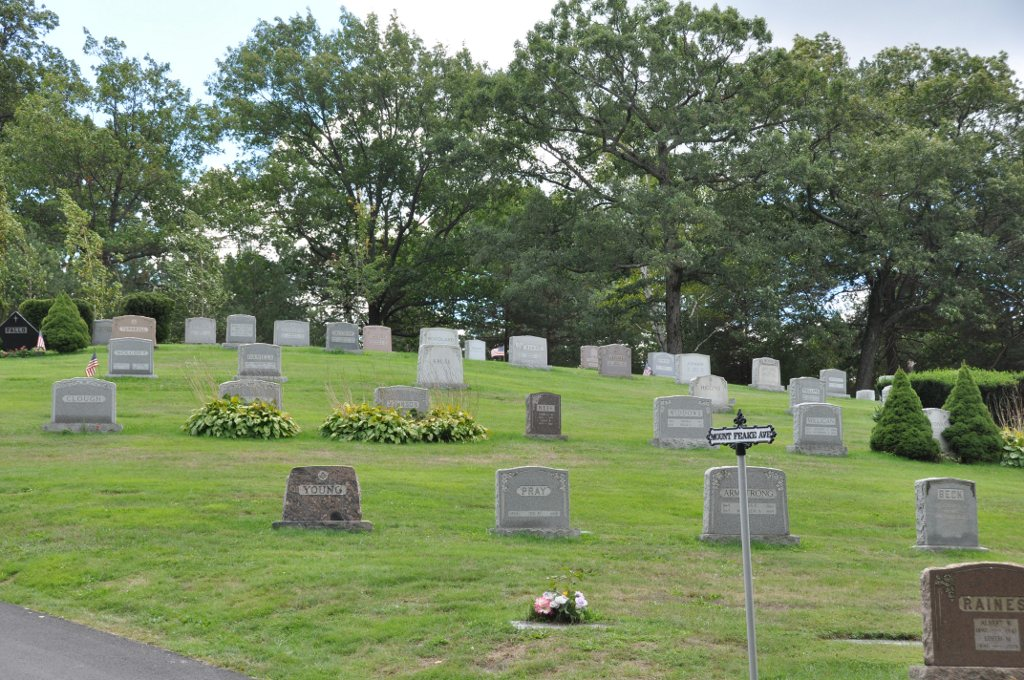
Mount Feake Cemetery in Waltham is located on Mount Feake, which was named after Robert Feake

Robert Feake (c. 1602-c.1661) was an early New England settler, soldier, goldsmith, and founder of what is now Greenwich, Connecticut.

== Biography ==
Coat of Arms of Robert Feake

Feake was a goldsmith and likely came to New England with the Winthrop fleet of 1630. Governor John Winthrop named Mount Feake in Waltham after Feake in 1632, and Feake Island (Fetch's Island) in Virginia is also named after him. Around 1633 Feake married Elizabeth Fones, the widow of Henry Winthrop, the Governor's son. Feake served as a lieutenant in the militia and lived in Watertown and was also involved in the settlement of Dedham in 1636. There is no record of him ever visiting Dedham, and he presumably was only asked to join the petition to the Great and General Court for his political influence. In return he was granted additional lands in Dedham.

In 1640 Robert and Elizabeth Feake left Massachusetts and became prominent figures in the history of Greenwich, Connecticut where they helped found the town and built the Feake-Ferris House (c. 1645) near Greenwich Point (originally Elizabeth's Neck) which still stands, as one of the oldest buildings in Connecticut. Feake encountered financial and mental health problems and eventually left his family and likely returned to England. His wife divorced him and remarried under Dutch law in New Netherland despite divorce being prohibited in the English colonies of Connecticut and Massachusetts.

== Legacy ==
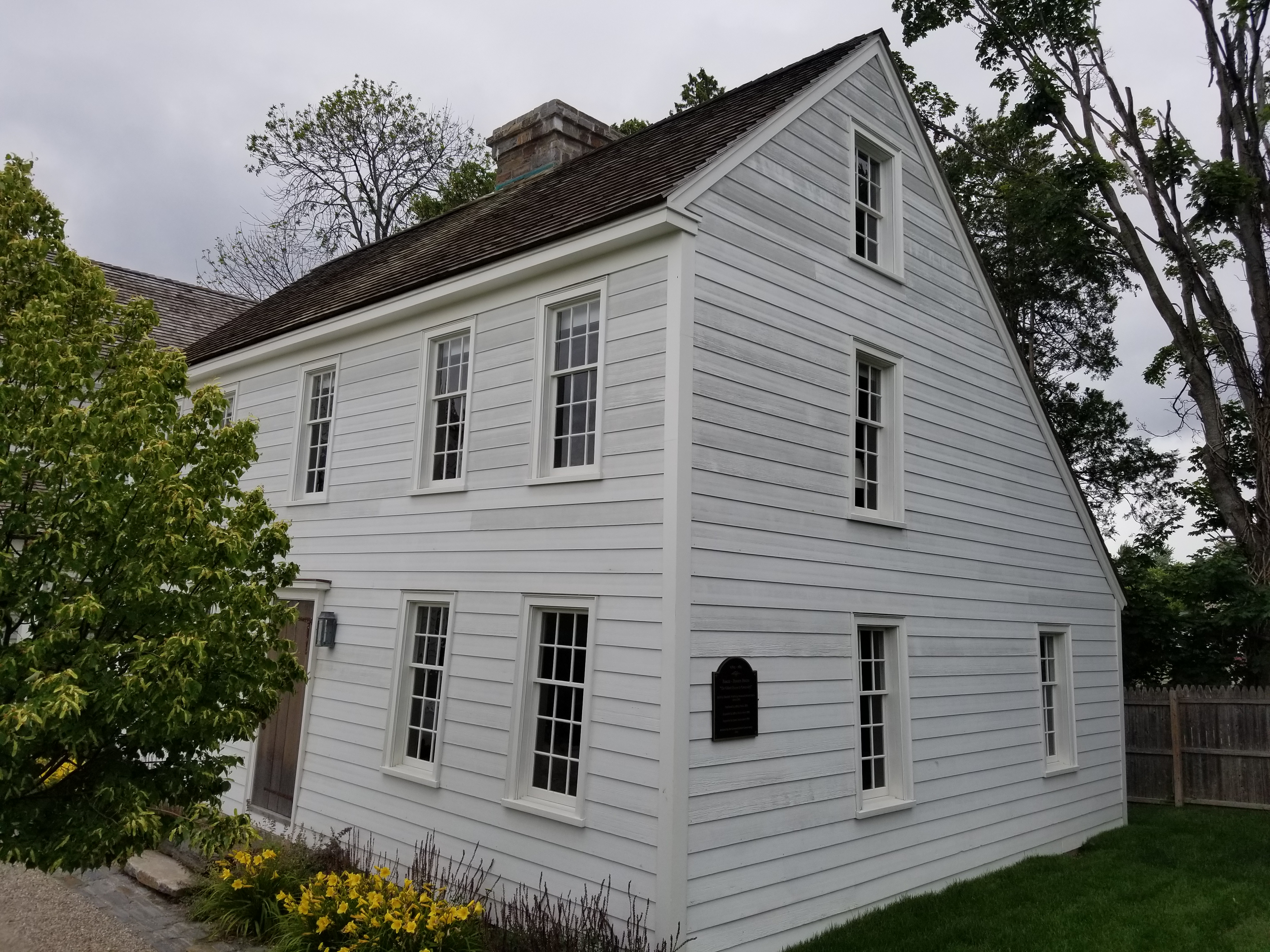
Feake Ferris House in Greenwich, Connecticut

Feake's daughter, Elizabeth, married John Underhill (captain) and daughter, Hannah, married John Bowne. Prominent descendants include John Alsop, Robert Feke, and Margaret Suckley.

Feake appears in various non-fiction and fictional books including The Winthrop Woman.

Feake's House in Greenwich is open to the public once a year.
