= Elizabeth Fones =

Settler of the Massachusetts Bay Colony (1610–1673)

- Born: 21 January 1610; Groton, England, Kingdom of England
- Died: c. 1673 (aged c. 63)
- Spouses: Henry Winthrop (m. 1629; died 1630) Robert Feake (m. 1632; div. 1647) William Hallett (m. 1649)
- Children: 4 daughters and 4 sons
- Parent(s): Thomas Fones; Anne Winthrop

Elizabeth Fones Winthrop Feake Hallett (21 January 1610 – c. 1673) was an early settler in the Massachusetts Bay Colony. In 1640 Fones, with her then-husband Robert Feake, were founders of Greenwich, Connecticut.

She married her third husband while her mentally ill second husband, from whom she was separated and whom she could not divorce, was still living; this was considered adultery and it scandalized the Puritan colony.

== Early life ==
Elizabeth Fones was born in Groton Manor, Suffolk, England on 21 January 1610 to Thomas Fones, a London apothecary, and his wife, Anne Winthrop, sister of John Winthrop, a staunch Puritan and the eventual Governor of the Massachusetts Bay Colony.

As a young girl, Fones worked at her father's shop in London. To the dismay of her family, she entered a whirlwind courtship with her first cousin Henry Winthrop, a son of Governor John Winthrop; they were married on 25 April 1629, at the Church of St. Sepulchre at New Gate, London. A year later, her husband sailed alone for the Massachusetts Bay Colony on the ship Talbot, leaving his young bride behind in England on account of her pregnancy. The baby, a daughter named Martha Johanna Winthrop, was born on 9 May 1630 at Groton Manor. Shortly after his arrival in Massachusetts, Henry was killed in a drowning accident on 2 July 1630 when he went swimming in the North River after visiting an Indian village near Salem.

== Massachusetts Bay Colony ==
Fones sailed to the Massachusetts Bay Colony with her infant daughter Martha aboard the Lyon, arriving on 2 November 1631. Her father-in-law, uncle and guardian, John Winthrop, served as Governor of the Colony.

In 1632, Fones married her second husband, a wealthy landowner named Lt. Robert Feake (born 1602 in London, England). He owned land in both Massachusetts and Connecticut. The marriage was arranged by her uncle (and former father-in-law), Gov. John Winthrop. In 1640, the Feakes acquired more land in what is now Greenwich, Connecticut. Indeed, she is considered one of the founders of Greenwich; what is now called 'Greenwich Point' was known for much of its early history as 'Elizabeth's Neck' in recognition of Elizabeth Fones and their 1640 purchase of the Point and much of what is today called Old Greenwich. The fact that she, as a woman, had property in her own name was viewed with dismay in the more rigid society of the day. They had five children: Elizabeth (born 1633), Hannah (born 1637), John (born 1639), Robert (born 1642) and Sarah (born before 1647). In 1647, due to financial, domestic, and personal problems, Lt. Feake went insane and abandoned his wife and children. Fones and Feake were separated or divorced by Dutch law in 1647.

== Scandal ==
Following her husband's desertion, Fones deeply scandalized the rigid Puritan society in which she lived by marrying William Hallett (born 1616) without evidence that she and Lt. Feake were divorced. Hallett may have been her husband's business manager, but modern evaluation finds no support for this. Fones had two sons with Hallett: William (born c. 1648) and Samuel (born c. 1650). Their marriage took place in August 1649, and was officiated by her former brother-in-law John Winthrop Jr. Only her close blood relationship to the Governor saved her from prosecution for adultery, for which she could have been hanged. Nevertheless, Fones and her new husband and family were forced to leave Connecticut and Massachusetts for the more tolerant Dutch colony of New Netherlands, where they were eventually recognized as husband and wife, possibly due to the friendship Fones formed with Judith Stuyvesant, wife of Director-General Peter Stuyvesant. The Halletts settled in an area which was later called Hallett's Cove and is now known as Astoria, Queens, near Hell Gate.

In September 1655, Fones and her family survived an attack by the Hackensack tribe; however, the Hackensack set fire to their house and farm, burning both to the ground. She purchased land in Flushing and Newtown, Queens County on 1 October from Edward Griffin. The following year, William Hallett was made "Schout" or chief-official of Flushing.

Upon the marriage of her daughter Hannah Feake to John Bowne, 7 May 1656, Hannah Feake and later John Bowne became Quakers.

Fones' date of death is uncertain and is disputed among historians. Her death likely occurred in Newtown, Queens County, New York. She was alive in 1668 and her widower remarried in 1674, so it is likely that her death took place in the early 1670s. She was likely buried at Hallett's Cove in the Hallet Burying Ground on Long Island. The remains were relocated to Mount Olivet Cemetery in 1905.

== Descendants ==
Fones has numerous descendants in the United States, including those descending from the marriage of her only child by Henry Winthrop, Martha Johanna, to Thomas Lyon of Byram Neck, Greenwich, Connecticut, whose home, the Thomas Lyon House, is on the National Register of Historic Places.

Fones' daughter Hannah Feake married John Bowne who was a North American pioneer for religious freedom with the Flushing Remonstrance. One of her grandchildren was the painter Robert Feke. Through Hannah Feake, Fones' descendant Robert Bowne founded publisher Bowne & Co. in 1775.

== Feake-Ferris house ==
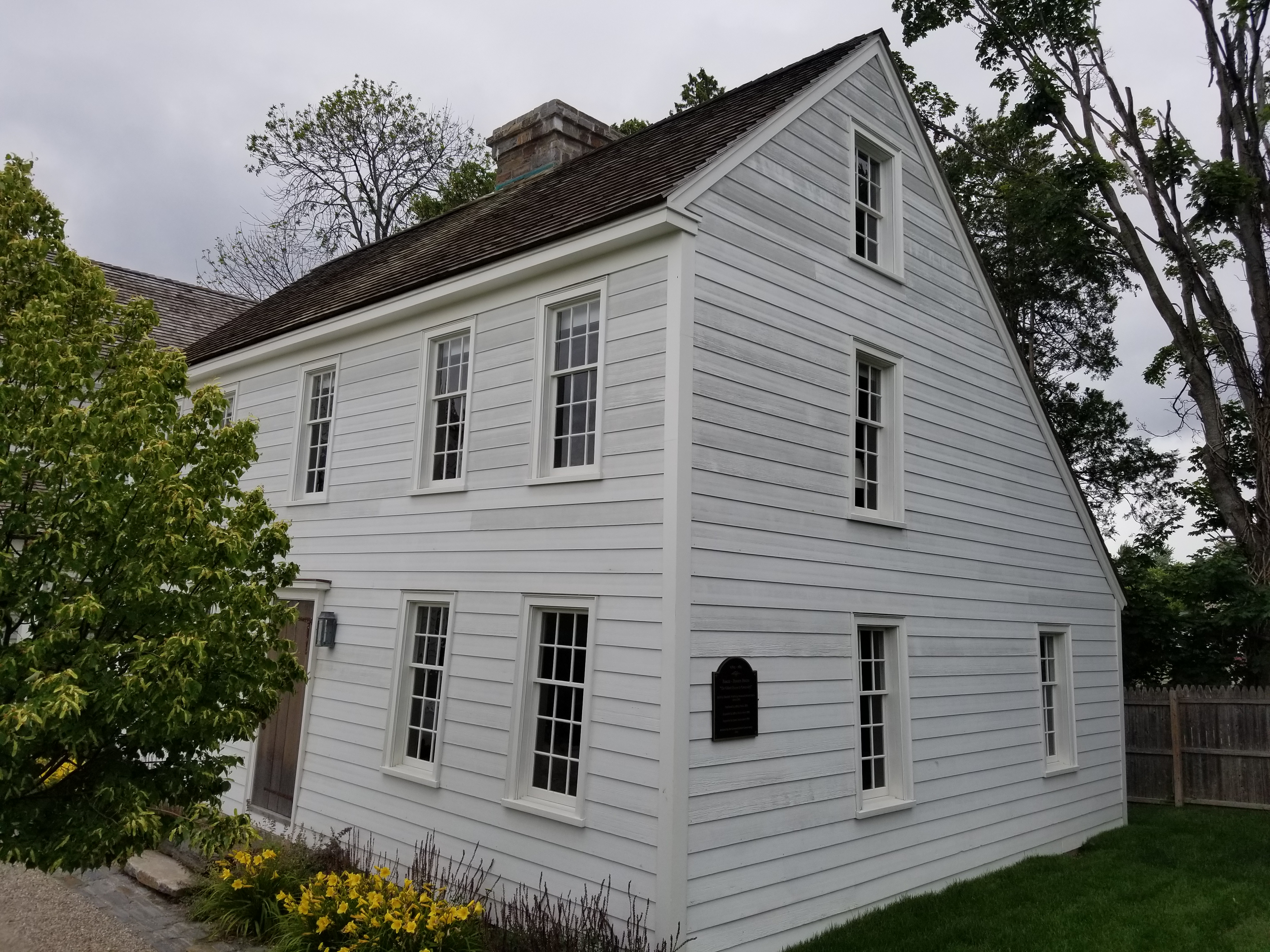
Feake Ferris House in 2021 after restoration

The house that Fones and her husband Robert built in Greenwich in 1645, the Feake-Ferris House, c. 1645–1689, still stands and is the oldest house in Greenwich. The house was restored in 2018 by the Greenwich Point Conservancy.

== In the media ==
- Seton, Anya. The Winthrop Woman. Historical fiction.
- Elizabeth Winthrop: All the Days of Her Life. 2000. Third Wave Television and Joni Steele Kimberlin. Narrated by Jackie Judd. Documentary.

== Sources ==
- Anderson, Robert Charles (1995). The Great Migration Begins, Volume II, G-O. Boston: New England Historic Genealogical Society.
- Bremer, Francis J. (2005). John Winthrop: America's Forgotten Founding Father. Oxford: Oxford University Press. ISBN 978-0-19-517981-1.
- Buckland, Miriam Renwick (2000). Elizabeth: Elizabeth Fones Winthrop Feake Hallett. Boston: Massachusetts Historical Society.
- Latting, John J. (1880). New York Genealogical and Biographical Record, 1880.
- Mayo, Lawrence Shaw (1948). The Winthrop Family in America. Boston: Massachusetts Historical Society.
- Mead, Spencer P. (1911). Ye Historie of Ye Town of Greenwich. New York: Knickerbocker Press.
- Miller, Robert B., ed. (1907). Lyon Memorial. Detroit: William Graham Press.
- Raymer, Robert George (1963). John Winthrop Governor of the Company of Massachusetts Bay in New England. New York: Vantage Press.
- Whitmore, William H. (1864). Notes on the Winthrop Family. Albany, NY: J. Munsell.
- Winthrop, R. C. (1891). Proceedings of the Massachusetts Historical Society. second series. VI. Boston: Massachusetts Historical Society.
- Wolfe, Missy (2012). Insubordinate Spirit: A True Story of Life and Loss in Earliest America 1610-1665. Connecticut: Globe Pequot Press. ISBN 9780762780402.
