= Alison Weir =

British author and historian

- Born: Alison Matthews; London, England
- Education: City of London School for Girls; University of North London
- Occupations: Author and public historian
- Spouse: Rankin Weir (m. 1972)
- Children: 2
- Writing career
- Language: English
- Genres: History; Historical fiction
- Subject: Primarily English royalty
- Website: www.alisonweir.org.uk

Alison Weir (née Matthews) is a British author and public historian. She primarily writes about the history of English royal women and families, in the form of biographies that explore their historical setting. She has also written numerous works of historical fiction.

Her first work, Britain's Royal Families (published in 1989), was a genealogical overview of the British royal family. She subsequently wrote biographies of Eleanor of Aquitaine, Isabella of France, Katherine Swynford, Elizabeth of York, and the Princes in the Tower. Other focuses have included Henry VIII and his family and England's Medieval Queens. Weir has published historical overviews of the Wars of the Roses and royal weddings, as well as historical fiction novels on English queens, including each wife of Henry VIII.

== Early life ==
Weir was brought up in Westminster, London. She has been married to Rankin Weir since 1972, and now lives in Surrey. She described her mother as "a genuinely good person with heaps of integrity, strength of character, humour and wisdom, and has overcome life's trials with commendable fortitude."

Weir recalls how, at the age of fourteen, she read Lozania Prole's Henry's Golden Queen, a "really trashy" novel about the life of Catherine of Aragon. Weir then became interested in the field of history.

She was educated at City of London School for Girls and North Western Polytechnic, becoming a history teacher. She opted to abandon teaching as a career after a disillusion with "trendy teaching methods", so she worked as a civil servant, and later as a housewife and mother. Between 1991 and 1997, she ran a school for children with learning difficulties.

== Career ==
=== Non-fiction ===
It has made me more confident in some ways. It has benefited me financially, of course, and enabled me to enrich the lives of others, but most important of all, it has made me feel fulfilled in a creative sense.

— Alison Weir on her writing career

In the 1970s, Weir spent four years researching and writing a biography of the six wives of Henry VIII. Her work was deemed too long by publishers, and was consequently rejected. A revised version would be published in 1991 as her second book, The Six Wives of Henry VIII. In 1981, she wrote a book on Jane Seymour, which was again rejected by publishers, this time because it was too short. Weir finally became a published author in 1989 with Britain's Royal Families, a compilation of genealogical information about the British royal family. She had revised the work eight times over a twenty-two-year period, and decided that it might be "of interest to others". After organising it into chronological order, The Bodley Head agreed to publish it.

Weir would not start writing full-time until the late 1990s. While running the school for children with learning difficulties, she published the non-fiction works The Princes in the Tower (1992), Lancaster and York: The Wars of the Roses (1995), and Children of England: The Heirs of King Henry VIII (1996). Now writing books full-time, she produced Elizabeth the Queen (1998) (published in America as The Life of Elizabeth I), Eleanor of Aquitaine: By the Wrath of God, Queen of England (1999), Henry VIII: The King and His Court (2001), Mary, Queen of Scots and the Murder of Lord Darnley (2003), and Isabella: She-Wolf of France, Queen of England (2005). Katherine Swynford: The Story of John of Gaunt and his Scandalous Duchess followed in 2007, and The Lady in The Tower: The Fall of Anne Boleyn in 2009. Traitors of the Tower came out in 2010. The following year, she completed The Ring and the Crown: A History of Royal Weddings and Mary Boleyn: The Mistress of Kings, the first full non-fiction biography of Mary Boleyn, sister of Anne Boleyn. In 2013 she published Elizabeth of York – A Tudor Queen and Her World, a biography on Elizabeth of York, mother of Henry VIII. Weir has written two books on England's Medieval Queens: Queens of Conquest published in 2017 and Queens of the Crusades, published 5 November 2020 by Random House.

Many of Weir's works deal with the Tudor period, which she considers "the most dramatic period in our history, with vivid, strong personalities... The Tudor period is the first one for which we have a rich visual record, with the growth of portraiture, and detailed sources on the private lives of kings and queens. This was an age that witnessed a growth in diplomacy and the spread of the printed word."

=== Fiction ===
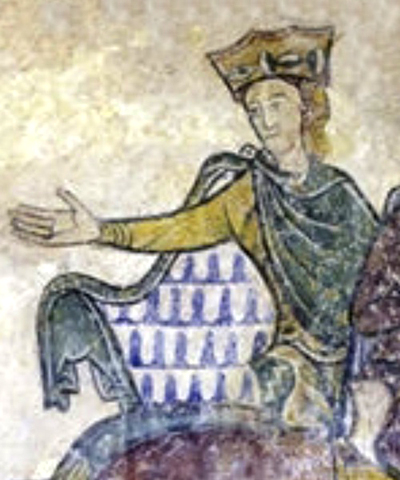
Weir has written two works on Eleanor of Aquitaine (pictured) – a non-fiction biography and a historical novel.

Weir wrote historical novels while a teenager, and her novel in the genre of historical fiction, Innocent Traitor, based on the life of Lady Jane Grey, was published in 2006. When researching Eleanor of Aquitaine, Weir realised that it would "be very liberating to write a novel in which I could write what I wanted while keeping to the facts". She decided to make Jane Grey her focus because she "didn't have a very long life and there wasn't a great deal of material". She found the transition to fiction easy, explaining, "Every book is a learning curve, and you have to keep an open mind. I am sometimes asked to cut back on the historical facts in my novels, and there have been disagreements over whether they obstruct the narrative, but I do hold out for the history whenever I can."

Her second novel is The Lady Elizabeth, which deals with the life of Queen Elizabeth I before her ascent to the throne. It was published in 2008 in the United Kingdom and United States. Her next novel, The Captive Queen, was released in the summer of 2010. Its subject, Eleanor of Aquitaine, had been the subject of a non-fiction biography by Weir in 1999.

Traitors of the Tower is a novella written by Weir and published on World Book Day 2010. Working with Quick Reads and Skillswise, Weir has recorded the first chapter as a taster and introduction to get people back into the habit of reading. Weir published The Marriage Game, a historical novel featuring Elizabeth I and Robert Dudley, 1st Earl of Leicester, in June 2014.

In May 2016 her novel Katherine of Aragon, The True Queen was published, the first of a six-book series on the theme of Six Tudor Queens, each covering one of Henry VIII's six wives. The final novel in the series, Katharine Parr, The Sixth Wife was published in May 2021.

== Writing style ==
Weir's writings have been described as being in the genre of popular history, an area that sometimes attracts criticism from academia; according to one source, popular history "seeks to inform and entertain a large general audience... Dramatic storytelling often prevails over analysis, style over substance, simplicity over complexity, and grand generalization over careful qualification." Weir argues that "history is not the sole preserve of academics, although I have the utmost respect for those historians who undertake new research and contribute something new to our knowledge. History belongs to us all, and it can be accessed by us all. And if writing it in a way that is accessible and entertaining, as well as conscientiously researched, can be described as popular, then, yes, I am a popular historian, and am proud and happy to be one." Kathryn Hughes, writing in The Guardian, said of Weir's popular historian label, "To describe her as a popular historian would be to state a literal truth – her chunky explorations of Britain's early modern past sell in the kind of multiples that others can only dream of."

Reviews of Weir's works have been mixed. The Independent said of The Lady in the Tower that "it is testament to Weir's artfulness and elegance as a writer that The Lady in the Tower remains fresh and suspenseful, even though the reader knows what's coming." On the other hand, Diarmaid MacCulloch, in a review of Henry VIII: King and Court, called it "a great pudding of a book, which will do no harm to those who choose to read it. Detail is here in plenty, but Tudor England is more than royal wardrobe lists, palaces and sexual intrigue." The Globe and Mail, reviewing the novel, The Captive Queen, said that she had "skillfully imagined royal lives" in previous works, "but her style here is marred by less than subtle characterizations and some seriously cheesy writing", while The Washington Post said of the same book, "12th-century France could be the dark side of the moon for all we learn about it by the end of this book."

== Personal life ==
Weir lives in Surrey with her husband, son and daughter. She has called "Mrs Ellen", a fictional character from her novel about Jane Grey, most like her own personality, commenting that, "As I was writing the book, my maternal side was projected into this character."

Weir is a supporter of the renovation of Northampton Castle, explaining that the estate is a "historic site of prime importance; it would be tragic if it were to be lost forever. I applaud the work of the Friends of Northampton Castle in lobbying for its excavation and for the regeneration of the area that would surely follow."

== Works ==
=== Non fiction ===
- Britain's Royal Families: The Complete Genealogy (1989)
- The Six Wives of Henry VIII (1991)
- The Princes in the Tower (1992), republished in 2014 as Richard III and the Princes in the Tower
- Lancaster and York – The Wars of the Roses (1995), published in the US as The Wars of the Roses
- Children of England: The Heirs of King Henry VIII (1996), published in the US as The Children of Henry VIII
- Elizabeth the Queen (1998), published in the US as The Life of Elizabeth I
- Eleanor of Aquitaine: By the Wrath of God, Queen of England (1999), published in the US as Eleanor of Aquitaine: A Life
- Henry VIII: King and Court (2001), published in the US as Henry VIII: The King and His Court
- Mary, Queen of Scots and the Murder of Lord Darnley (2003)
- Isabella: She-Wolf of France, Queen of England (2005), published in the US as Queen Isabella
- Katherine Swynford: The Story of John of Gaunt and his Scandalous Duchess (2007), published in the US as Mistress of the Monarchy: The Life of Katherine Swynford, Duchess of Lancaster
- The Lady in the Tower: The Fall of Anne Boleyn (2009)
- Traitors of the Tower (2010)
- The Ring and the Crown: A History of Royal Weddings (2011), co-authored with Kate Williams, Sarah Gristwood and Tracy Borman
- Mary Boleyn: The Great and Infamous Whore (2011), published in the US as Mary Boleyn: The Mistress of Kings
- Elizabeth of York: The First Tudor Queen (2013), published in the US as Elizabeth of York: A Tudor Queen and Her World
- The Lost Tudor Princess: A Life of Margaret Douglas, Countess of Lennox (2015)
- Queens of the Conquest (2017)
- A Tudor Christmas (2018)
- Queens of the Crusades (2020)
- Queens of the Age of Chivalry (2022)

=== Fiction ===
- Innocent Traitor (2006)
- The Lady Elizabeth (2008)
- The Captive Queen (2010)
- Dangerous Inheritance (2012), published in the US as Dangerous Inheritance: A Novel of Tudor Rivals and the Secret of the Tower
- The Marriage Game: A Novel of Elizabeth I (2014)
- Katherine of Aragon: The True Queen (2016)
- Anne Boleyn: A King's Obsession (2017)
- Jane Seymour: The Haunted Queen (2018)
- Anna of Kleve: Queen of Secrets (2019)
- Katheryn Howard: The Tainted Queen (2020)
- Katherine Parr: The Sixth Wife (2021)
- In the Shadow of Queens: Tales from the Tudor Court (2021)
- Elizabeth of York: The Last White Rose (May 2022)
- Henry VIII: The Heart and the Crown (May 2023), published in the US as The King's Pleasure: A Novel of Henry VIII
- Mary I: Queen of Sorrows (May 2024), published in the US as The Passionate Tudor: A Novel of Queen Mary I (May 2024)
- The Cardinal: The Secret Life of Thomas Wolsey (May 2025)
- The Boleyn Secret (May 2026)
