= Green Darkness =

1972 novel by Anya Seton

- First edition cover
- Author: Anya Seton
- Language: English
- Genre: Historical, Romance novel
- Publisher: Houghton Mifflin
- Publication date: 1 November 1972
- Publication place: United States
- Media type: Print (Hardback & Paperback)
- Pages: 480 pp (first edition, hardback)
- ISBN: 0-340-15979-0 (first edition, hardback)
- OCLC: 59141914

Green Darkness is a 1972 novel by Anya Seton. It spent six months on The New York Times Best Seller list and became her most popular novel.

== Plot summary ==
In the 1960s, young Celia Marsdon is a rich American heiress who, upon her marriage to English aristocrat Richard Marsdon, goes to live at an ancestral manor in Sussex, England. Shortly afterward, strange things begin to occur — Richard begins acting out of character, and Celia starts to have strange fits and visions. Celia's mother, Lily Taylor, has befriended a Hindu guru, Dr. Akananda, and it is he who discovers what's wrong with the young couple. The troubles of the present time can only be solved by revisiting a tragedy from the past.

The book then moves back in time to the reign of Edward VI, as lovely young Celia de Bohun and her guardian aunt take up residence with the noble Catholic family of Anthony Browne as "poor relations." Celia is a fascinating and believable character, full of contradictions and human failings. She is headstrong and impulsive; innocent but coquettish; and can easily attract male attention. She creates a scandal when she becomes infatuated with the family chaplain, Stephen Marsdon, who in turn desires Celia but does not want to break his vow of chastity. They are forced to part, but never forget each other. Time passes; King Edward dies and his persecution of Catholics ends, only to be followed by his successor Queen Mary I's persecution of Protestants; the Browne family fortunes prosper under the Marian reign; and sympathetic characters harden into detestable ones. When Celia and Stephen finally meet again, nothing can stop the passion between them. It ends tragically. The Tudor story and the narrative returns to the 1960s to find resolution in the present and lay to rest the tormented souls of Stephen and Celia so that Richard and his wife can live together happily without visions of their past lives coming between them.

== Historical background ==
The Manor House setting in Green Darkness at Ightham Mote was faithfully replicated at Cape Elizabeth, Maine by Charles Henry Robinson. It was named 'Hidden Court' and can still be seen as of 2004.

The Spread Eagle Inn and Cowdray House are real places in Midhurst, West Sussex, England, as is St Ann's Hill, where Midhurst Castle once stood.

== Reception ==
Green Darkness was reviewed by Kirkus Reviews.
