= Dragonwyck (novel) =

1944 novel by Anya Seton

- First edition
- Author: Anya Seton
- Language: English
- Genre: Historical Romance
- Publisher: Houghton Mifflin
- Publication date: 1944
- Publication place: United States
- Media type: Print (Hardback & Paperback)
- Pages: 255 pp
- ISBN: 978-1-55652-581-0

Dragonwyck is a novel written by American author Anya Seton which was first published in 1944. It is the fictional story of the life of Miranda Wells and her abusive marriage to Nicholas Van Ryn, set against the historical background of the Patroon system, Anti-Rent Wars, the Astor Place Riots, and steamboat racing on the Hudson River.

The novel was adapted into the film Dragonwyck (1946).

== Plot summary ==
The story begins in May 1844 with Miranda Wells, the daughter of a humble farmer in Greenwich, Connecticut. Abigail, Miranda's mother, receives a letter from Nicholas Van Ryn, who is Abigail's maternal half-first cousin and Patroon of a large manor called Dragonwyck near Hudson, New York. In the letter, Van Ryn invites one of the Wells girls to Dragonwyck as a companion for his six-year-old daughter, Katrine. After initial doubts, Miranda's parents allow her to go to Dragonwyck where she is instantly attracted to and intrigued by the rich, enigmatic, and dashing Nicholas.

Not everyone welcomes Miranda to Dragonwyck. Nicholas' corpulent and lazy wife, Johanna, sees Miranda as a threat, and tries to keep her away from her husband. Soon, Miranda encounters kindly Dr. Jeff(erson) Turner, a skilled physician and a passionate anti-renter who believes that rich Patroons, like the Van Ryns, should give up their large estates. Van Ryn and Turner instantly dislike each other. Miranda is baffled when Nicholas asks the doctor to attend to his wife, who has a cold. However, while Dr. Turner is at Dragonwyck, Johanna becomes violently ill and dies. As Dr. Turner leaves, wondering what caused such a sudden death, Nicholas proposes to Miranda and she accepts.

Marriage to Nicholas Van Ryn is far from what Miranda imagined. Despite him brutally forcing himself on her on their wedding night, she makes excuses for him and remains loyal. As the story continues, Nicholas's true mental state and his egotistical thirst for power become evident. After their newborn son dies, the relationship between Miranda and the now opium-addicted Nicholas withers. Meanwhile, the bond between Miranda and Dr. Turner strengthens. Although the marriage improves, this proves to be short-lived. Miranda's suspicions are aroused by Johanna's secret diary; Dr. Turner eventually determines that Nicholas poisoned Johanna with oleander resembling nutmeg on a cake. They confront him, then plan to escape, but Nicholas catches up with Miranda on a steamboat traveling down the Hudson River. The steamboat gets caught up in a race, catches fire, and crashes. Nicholas saves Miranda, but he dies having rescued other passengers. After the ordeal, Miranda and Dr. Turner marry and plan to leave the Hudson Valley for a new life in California.

== Reception ==
Kirkus Reviews called it "early 19th-century decor for a good story – a holding drama and colorful".

Nina Brown Baker of the New York Times wrote, "It is disappointing that against this rich and satisfying background Miss Seton has chosen to set a trite Victorian melodrama", and "Dragonwyck is so real a house, set so solidly in such a real world, that it deserves worthier inhabitants than these pallid ghosts from a Bertha M. Clay past".

== Editions ==
Philippa Gregory wrote the foreword to the 2005 edition.

Hillary Huber and Bonnie Hurren narrate audiobook adaptations.

== See also ==
- Manor of Rensselaerswyck, the historic patroonship in the Hudson River Valley of New York where Dragonwyck is placed.
