= The Turquoise =

1946 novel by Anya Seton

- First edition
- Author: Anya Seton
- Language: English
- Genre: Historical romance
- Publisher: Houghton Mifflin
- Publication date: 1946
- Publication place: United States
- Media type: Print (Hardback & Paperback)
- Pages: 374 pp

The Turquoise is a novel by the American author Anya Seton which was first published in 1946.

It is a fictional story of the life of Fey Cameron set against an historical background of the United States and New York society in the mid 19th century.

The book focuses on Cameron, from her humble childhood in New Mexico, through to her high society life in New York, and her eventual return to her roots.

== Plot summary ==
Born in 1850 of a Spanish mother and a Scotsman in New Mexico, and orphaned at a young age in the town for whom she was named, Santa Fe (Fey) Cameron is taken in and raised by dutiful but apathetic neighbors. As a teenager, hot-blooded Fey takes the opportunity to leave town with Terry Dillon, a shifty traveling salesman. As they slowly make their way up the Santa Fe Trail, Fey convinces herself they are in love. Not disagreeable (for the time being), Terry enlists Richens Lacey Wootton to marry them at Raton Pass. Continuing east selling Terry's questionable medicine and utilizing several of Fey's talents to earn extra money, upon reaching Leavenworth, Kansas, they are able to raise train fares to New York.

Fey and Terry arrive in New York City without any prospects and are soon forced to use up their small savings for food and board. Terry soon abandons Fey for greener pastures. Discovering she is pregnant, resourceful Fey seeks assistance at a local infirmary for women and makes arrangements to live there in exchange for helping out with the work. After her daughter Lucita is born, bewitching Fey sets her eyes on New York tycoon Simeon Tower as a means of securing her financial future and wins her way into his heart.

After securing a discreet divorce for Fey, she and Simeon marry and achieve happiness. They endeavor to increase not only their fortune but their social standing over the years, but the year 1877 would be their downfall. Simeon not only finds himself close to losing nearly everything financially, but Terry Dillon reemerges to disrupt their lives. Terry's attempts to woo Fey and blackmail Simeon result in tragedy. Bankrupt and a social pariah, Fey eventually brings an ailing Simeon back to the simple life in New Mexico to live out their days.

== Reception ==
Kirkus Reviews wrote the novel had "a synthetic, but satisfactory, story".
