= Anya Seton =

American author of historical fiction (1904-1990)

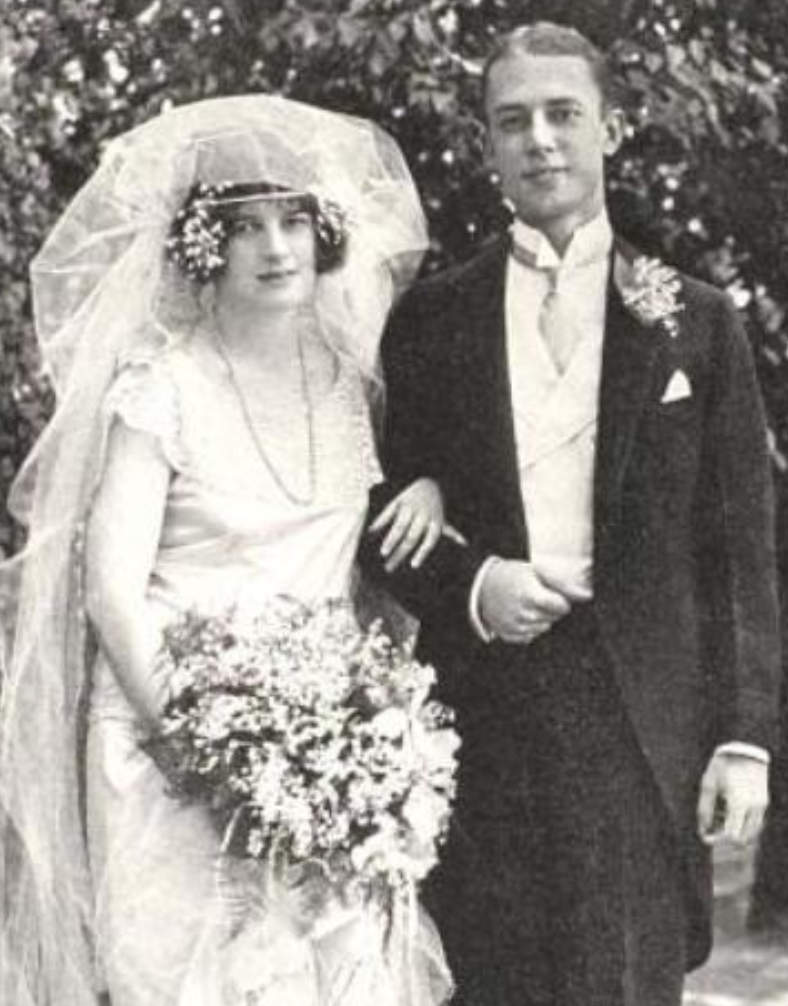
- Seton at her wedding to her first husband Hamilton Cottier, from a 1923 publication
- Born: Ann Seton; January 23, 1904; Manhattan, New York
- Died: November 8, 1990 (aged 86); Old Greenwich, Connecticut
- Resting place: Putnam Cemetery
- Occupation: Author
- Spouses: Hamilton Cottier (m. 1923; div. 1930) Hamilton M. Chase (m. 1930; div. 1968)
- Children: 3
- Parent(s): Ernest Thompson Seton (father); Grace Gallatin Seton Thompson (mother)
- Writing career
- Language: English
- Genre: Historical fiction
- Notable works: Katherine; Green Darkness

Anya Seton (January 23, 1904 – November 8, 1990), born Ann Seton, was an American author of historical fiction, or as she preferred they be called, "biographical novels".

== Early life and education ==
Anya Seton was born Ann Seton on January 23, 1904, at her parents' Bryant Park apartment in New York City. Her father, Ernest Thompson Seton, was Boy Scouts of America co-founder, naturalist, and author. Ernest, a British immigrant, has notable Scottish lineage in Northumberland. Ernest and his family immigrated to Canada in 1866, later moving to America. Her mother was Grace Gallatin Seton Thompson, an author, suffragist, two-time president of the National League of American Pen Women, and founder of the Campfire Girls. Seton grew up in the Connecticut towns of Cos Cob and Greenwich.

Seton was primarily educated by private tutors and graduated from Spence School. She graduated on May 17, 1921, with a diploma in English but she never attended college. The Setons were wealthy, and Seton often traveled with her parents. Despite her family's money, Seton very often moved homes. Because of this, Seton was unable to think of any place as her true home, nor any school as her true school. Ernest was often away, and even when he was around, he frequently criticized his daughter. Since her parents were often busy with their careers, Seton spent much time with her governess.

Seton's parents did not have any other children. They separated in the late 1920s and divorced in 1934. Following the divorce, her father moved to New Mexico.

== Career ==
Seton published her first novel, My Theodosia, in 1941.

Seton's historical novels were noted for how extensively she researched the historical facts, and some of them were best-sellers: Dragonwyck (1944) and Foxfire (1950) were both made into Hollywood films. Three of her books are classics in their genre and continue in their popularity to the present: Katherine (1954), the story of Katherine Swynford, the mistress and eventual wife of John of Gaunt, and their children, who were the direct ancestors of the Tudors, Stuarts, and the modern British royal family; Green Darkness (1973), the story of a modern couple plagued by their past life incarnations; and The Winthrop Woman about the notorious Elizabeth Fones, niece and daughter-in-law of John Winthrop, the first governor of the Massachusetts Bay Colony. Most of her novels have been recently republished, several with forewords by Philippa Gregory. In 2003, Katherine was chosen as Britain’s 95th best-loved novel of all time in a nationwide poll conducted by the BBC.

Her 1962 novel Devil Water concerns James, the luckless Earl of Derwentwater and his involvement with the Jacobite rising of 1715. She also narrates the story of his brother Charles, beheaded after the 1745 rebellion, the last man to die for the cause. The action of the novel moves back and forth between Northumberland, Tyneside, London, and Virginia. Seton stated that the book developed out of her love for Northumberland. She certainly visited her Snowdon cousins at Felton. Billy Pigg, the celebrated Northumbrian piper played "Derwentwater's Farewell" especially for her. The novel shows her typical thorough research of events and places, though the accents are a little wayward. Seton said that her greatest debt of all was to Amy Flagg of Westoe Village in South Shields, her father's birthplace.

== Personal life ==
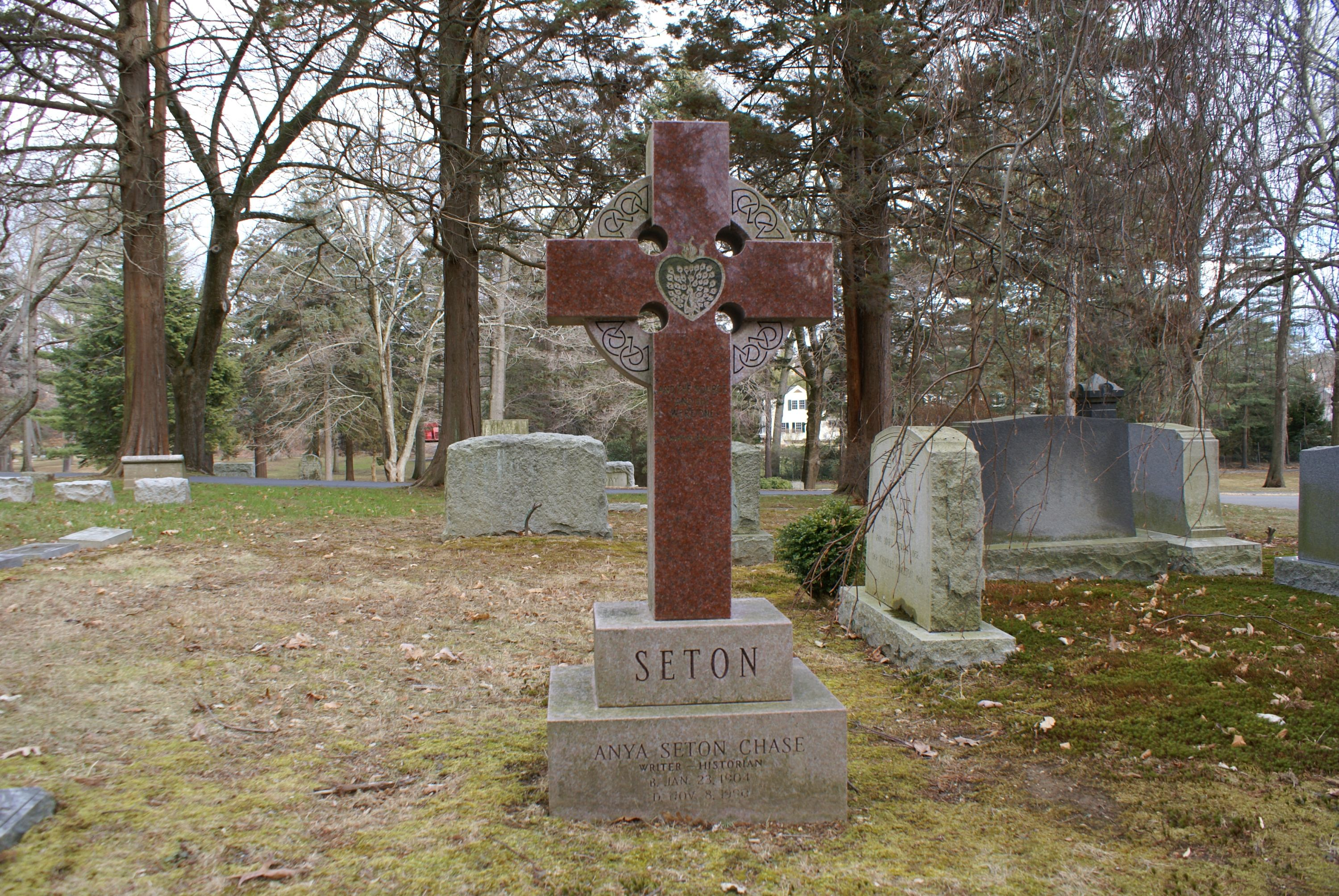
The grave of Anya Seton in Putnam Cemetery in Greenwich, Connecticut

Seton married twice. Her first marriage was to Hamilton "Ham" Cottier, a Rhodes scholar, whom she married when she was 19 years old. In 1925, Seton gave birth to their first child, a daughter named Pamela. Their second child, Seton, was born in 1928 and died of an overdose in 1979. Seton and Cottier divorced in 1930 following several extramarital affairs on Seton's part.

Two weeks later, Seton married investment counselor Hamilton "Chan" M. Chase, whom she had had an affair with. Seton and Chase spent the early years of their marriage at her childhood home in Greenwich, Connecticut, Little Peequo, with Seton's mother. They later built a home called Sea Rune in Old Greenwich, Connecticut. In 1930, Seton gave birth to the couple's only daughter, Clemency. They divorced in 1968, though Seton continued to live at Sea Rune until her death.

Seton died of heart failure at the age of 86 on November 8, 1990, at Sea Rune in Old Greenwich, Connecticut, and was survived by Pamela and Clemency, five grandchildren, and a great-grandchild. She is interred at Putnam Cemetery in Greenwich.

== Works ==
- My Theodosia (1941)
- Dragonwyck (1944)
- The Turquoise (1946)
- The Hearth and Eagle (1948)
- Foxfire (1951)
- Katherine (1954)
- The Mistletoe and Sword: A Story of Roman Britain (1955)
- The Winthrop Woman (1958)
- Washington Irving (1960) illustrated by Harvé Stein
- Devil Water (1962)
- Avalon (1965)
- Green Darkness (1973)
- Smouldering Fires (1975)
