= The Darkwar Saga =

Novel series by Raymond E. Feist

- First edition covers.
- Flight of the Nighthawks; Into a Dark Realm; Wrath of a Mad God
- Author: Raymond E. Feist
- Cover artist: Dominic Forbes
- Country: United Kingdom
- Language: English
- Genre: Fantasy
- Publisher: HarperCollins
- Published: 2005-2008
- Media type: Print (hardback & paperback)
- Preceded by: Conclave of Shadows
- Followed by: The Demonwar Saga

The Darkwar Saga is a series of fantasy novels by the American writer Raymond E. Feist.

== Concept ==
In Feist's fantasy novels, a riftwar is war between two worlds that are connected by some sort of dimensionless gap (a rift). In his invented history there are several riftwars. The first riftwar between Midkemia and Kelewan is described in the trilogy The Riftwar Saga. This saga is a continuation of Feist's preceding works and so far suggests an upcoming, fourth riftwar. Feist has confirmed that there are five riftwars in total. The Darkwar will be followed by the Demonwar and Chaoswar.

== Works ==
=== Flight of the Nighthawks (2005) ===
Leso Varen is still at large and the Conclave of the Shadows must find a way to neutralize ten thousand magical warriors who are hidden in a cave on the other side of the world. In Kelewan, Magnus and the Tsurani magicians are studying a talnoy and discover that is a beacon for a huge army of alien invaders. Meanwhile, Kaspar, Talwin and Caleb have been sent to The Empire of Great Kesh to uncover a nest of Night Hawks who are plotting to overthrow the government.

=== Into a Dark Realm (2006) ===
Leso Varen has moved to wreak havoc on the world of Kelewan and Pug and the Conclave of the Shadows are determined to find him, only to find out he has stolen a body of a Tsurani magician. Pug, Magnus, Nakor and Ralan Bek lead a desperate expedition into the Dasati realm hoping to find the key to defeating the enemy who threatens their homeworld.

=== Wrath of a Mad God (2008) ===
On the world of the Dasati, Pug and the other Conclave members must find a way to save their people from the magician, Leso Varen, and the wrath of the mad god he has awoken. Miranda must find a way to save herself from the clutches of the Deathpriests who have held her captive on the world of Kelewan.
