= Flight of the Nighthawks =

2005 novel by Raymond E. Feist

- Flight of the Nighthawks first edition cover.
- Author: Raymond E. Feist
- Cover artist: Dominic Forbes
- Language: English
- Series: Darkwar Saga
- Genre: Fantasy
- Publisher: Voyager Books
- Publication date: September 30, 2005
- Publication place: United States; United Kingdom
- Media type: Print (hardback & paperback)
- Pages: 420 (first edition)
- ISBN: 0-00-713374-X
- Followed by: Into a Dark Realm

Flight of the Nighthawks is a fantasy novel by American writer Raymond E. Feist. It is the first book in the Darkwar Saga and was published in 2005. It was followed by Into a Dark Realm which was published in 2006.

== Plot introduction ==
Leso Varen is still at large and the Conclave of the Shadows must find a way to neutralize ten thousand magical warriors that are hidden in a cave on the other side of the world. In Kelewan, Magnus and the Tsurani magicians are studying a Talnoy and discover that is a beacon for a huge army of alien invaders. Meanwhile, Kaspar, Talwin and Caleb have been sent to The Empire of Great Kesh to uncover a nest of Night Hawks who are plotting to overthrow the government.

== Plot summary ==
Flight of the Nighthawks focuses primarily on the adventures of two young boys, Tad and Zane, and the organization they become involved with, the Conclave of Shadows. The story picks up shortly after the end of Exile's Return (2004), the final book in the preceding Conclave of Shadows series by Feist. The book begins in the town of Stardock, where the two boys are still living at home. Marie, Tad's biological mother and Zane's surrogate mother (Zane's parents having died years earlier during an attack by trolls on the town) is concerned about the boys' tendency to get into trouble, and when her lover, Caleb (son of the magician Pug), comes back to Stardock, she begs him to take the boys to be apprenticed. Caleb consents and travels with the boys to The Empire of Great Kesh to find them an apprenticeship. Along the journey they are ambushed by bandits and Caleb is gravely wounded. The boys manage to bring Caleb to a friend, and unbeknownst to them, an agent of the Conclave. The Conclave is able to heal Caleb, and while they decide what to do with the boys, Caleb decides to formalize his long relationship with Marie and marries her, adopting the boys as well.

The Conclave becomes aware of trouble in the capital of Kesh, where nobles are being murdered, ostensibly as part of political maneuvering between two factions to establish the next emperor. The Conclave sends three sets of agents to investigate: Talwin Hawkins and his assassin-turned-servant Petro Amafi, Kaspar and Pasko, and Caleb and the boys. During their time in the city, Tad and Zane are aided in a fight by a boy named Jommy who has been living in the streets, whom Caleb also takes into his care. The Conclave's agents discover that the necromancer, Leso Varen, has entrenched himself and intends to use the secret guild of assassins, the Nighthawks, to cause utter chaos in Great Kesh. Kaspar realizes that Varen has taken over the body of the Emperor, while Caleb falls into a trap set for them by the Nighthawks, and barely manages to escape alive. The Conclave agents regroup, and make plans to root out the nest of Nighthawks and foil Varen's plan. Pug and Magnus (his eldest son and Caleb's older brother) venture into the sewers to locate the Nighthawks' hideout, but both possible locations are empty. The Conclave realizes the Nighthawks have established themselves in the palace itself, and the entire royal family is in danger.

On the eve of Banapis, the midsummer celebration and the biggest festival of the year, Varen reveals himself and attempts to kill the members of the royal court. He is stopped by the Conclave, with Caleb and the boys stumbling into a Nighthawk staging area and assisting in its destruction, Kaspar managing to aid in securing the safety of the emperor's heirs, and Pug, Miranda, Nakor, and Magnus opposing Varen's deadly magic. In the end, Varen's body is destroyed, but his soul manages to escape again through a rift into the world of Kelewan.
