= Silverthorn (novel) =

1985 novel by Raymond E. Feist

- Silverthorn first edition cover
- Author: Raymond E. Feist
- Cover artist: Kinuko Y. Craft
- Language: English
- Series: The Riftwar Saga
- Genre: Fantasy
- Publisher: Doubleday
- Publication date: May 7, 1985
- Publication place: United States
- Media type: Print (Hardback & Paperback)
- Pages: 352 (first edition)
- ISBN: 0-385-19210-X
- OCLC: 10301472
- Dewey Decimal: 813/.54 19
- LC Class: PS3556.E446 S5 1985
- Preceded by: Magician
- Followed by: A Darkness at Sethanon

Silverthorn is a fantasy novel by American writer Raymond E. Feist. Released in 1985, it is the sequel to Feist's earlier novel Magician and was followed by A Darkness at Sethanon, the final book in The Riftwar Saga.

== Plot ==
A year after his brother Lyam's coronation as king, Arutha returns to his city as the new Prince of Krondor, to begin plans for his wedding. Jimmy the Hand, a young thief, foils an assassination attempt on the prince by a fellow thief, and feeling loyalty toward the prince from previously aiding his escape from the city with Princess Anita (in Magician), he chooses to warn the prince of the attempt on his life instead of reporting the traitor to the Mockers, Krondor's powerful and highly organized guild of thieves. Arutha seeks the Mockers' cooperation to obtain more information on the assassins, and at their request, makes Jimmy a squire of his court. Setting a trap, they capture two agents, who are revealed to be operating out of the temple of Lims-Kragma, Goddess of Death, one of whom is a moredhel whose appearance has been altered. During interrogation, both prisoners will themselves to death rather than divulge their plans. As the High Priestess of Lims-Kragma seeks the truth by bringing them back from beyond the grave, one of the prisoners rises by the power of an unknown enemy, and attacks his captors, slaughtering many royal guards, and addressing Arutha as "Lord of the West" before being destroyed by Father Nathan, a priest of Sung.

Injured in the attack, the High Priestess warns Arutha that the forces which opposed him were so powerful that they held the gods in contempt. Arutha leads a strike on the assassins' hideout in Krondor, but even as the assault appears to be going in their favor, the assassins begin rising from the dead and renewing their attack. Many of Arutha's men are slain, and the Black Slayers are only defeated when the entire building is burned to the ground. Believing the threat to be over for the time being, Arutha proceeds with his wedding. Just before the ceremony, Jimmy senses something is wrong, and finds the same assassin from the first attempt on Arutha's life hiding on the roof. He manages to disrupt the assassin just as he is firing at Arutha, but the poisoned bolt strikes Anita instead. The assassin is interrogated, and reveals the enemy to be Murmandamus, a moredhel chieftain and powerful sorcerer. According to a prophecy, Arutha is the only force that stands in the way of Murmandamus's total destruction of the Kingdom and domination over the realm. The assassin also reveals that the poison was given to him by a moredhel agent, who called it "silverthorn".

Pug is able to keep Anita under a spell that slows the passage of time, giving Arutha time to search for an antidote. With scant clues, he secretly leads a party to the one place most likely to have the answer to any question, the great library at Sarth Abbey. All along his journey, he is tracked by Murad, one of Murmandamus's top generals. They manage to reach the abbey, but their enemies strike again with powerful sorcery, both attacks barely repulsed by the mighty defenses of Sarth Abbey and its priests. From information gathered at the abbey, Arutha's quest turns to the elves of Elvandar for more information.

Meanwhile, Pug returns to Stardock to seek the aid of a scryer, whose vision of the future reveals a dark force behind Murmandamus, a powerful enemy speaking in ancient Tsurani, who is even capable of perceiving the scryer past the barriers of time and probability. Believing the threat therefore to be a danger to both worlds, Pug seeks more information from the Tsurani Assembly of magicians, and with the help of research from the books of Macros, creates a new rift to Kelewan and returns to his old estate with two companions, posing as priests.

In Elvandar, Arutha is told that the silverthorn plant can also serve as the cure, and grows only around the lake Moraelin, in moredhel-held territory, surrounded by a barrier the elves are unable to pass. He and his band set out for Moraelin.

In Kelewan, Pug arrives to find himself removed from the Assembly and declared an outlaw. His old friend and fellow Great One Hochopepa is willing to aid him, but they are captured by a Great One loyal to the current Warlord, who seeks to gain control of the Empire. Tortured by the Warlord and his inquisitors, and with his Greater Path magic neutralized, Pug turns to the Lesser Path, becoming the second magician ever to master both paths after Macros the Black. He is able to overcome his captors, and explains his reasons for returning to the Emperor, who grants him reprieve to continue his search in the Assembly's vast libraries. He arrives at the conclusion that the ancient Tsurani enemy has returned, posing a grave threat to both worlds. Pug is reinstated by the Assembly, and following a clue, travels to the northern polar wastelands of Kelewan, discovering a lost race of elves living in a forest under the ice, twin to Elvandar on Midkemia. Their leader, Acaila, offers to instruct Pug in magic over the course of the following year, in order to better face the coming trials.

Meanwhile, Arutha and his band manage to sneak past the moredhel sentries, and discover several silverthorn shrubs in the lake, and make their escape back towards Elvandar. Just as they are about to reach the safety of the Elven forest, they are overtaken by Murad and a band of black slayers. With the help of Tomas, they manage to defeat their enemies and return safely to Elvandar.

With the antidote made by the elven Spellweavers, Anita is saved, and Arutha's enemies set back by the death of one of their generals, but Murmandamus vows to regather his armies the next year, when the long-awaited invasion into the Kingdom will commence.

== Reception ==
A reviewer at Kirkus concluded that the book was "a notch above average overall" because of the "modestly appealing characters, and a more thoughtful array of evil beasties and bad guys than before."
