= Rage of a Demon King =

1997 novel by Raymond E. Feist

- First UK edition
- Author: Raymond E. Feist
- Cover artist: Geoff Taylor
- Language: English
- Series: The Serpentwar Saga
- Genre: Fantasy
- Publisher: HarperCollins (UK); Avon Books (US)
- Publication date: 7 April 1997
- Publication place: United States; United Kingdom
- Media type: Print (Hardback & Paperback)
- Pages: 400 (first edition)
- ISBN: 0-00-224149-8
- OCLC: 43226772
- Preceded by: Rise of a Merchant Prince
- Followed by: Shards of a Broken Crown

Rage of a Demon King is a fantasy novel by American writer Raymond E. Feist, the third book in his Serpentwar Saga and the eleventh book of his Riftwar cycle. It was published in 1997 in the United States by Avon Books and the United Kingdom by HarperCollins. At the opening of the novel Erik Von Darkmoor is helping to train soldiers for The Kingdom's armies while Rupert, at the height of his trading success, is coerced into financing the war. Meanwhile the forces of the Emerald Queen are approaching Krondor, and it is discovered her target is the "Lifestone", the legendary device discovered by Pug and his cohorts in A Darkness at Sethanon.

== Synopsis ==
The Emerald Queen's army is almost upon Midkemia and the army is staging. Erik Von Darkmoor is sergeant-major of the King's armies and Rupert is almost single-handedly financing the war. The Emerald Queen and her army are making for the Lifestone, a magical source of power capable of destroying worlds. Vast preparations are being made in Krondor, the anticipated point of invasion by the Emerald Queen's army, and all of Midkemia's allies - as well as some enemies - are being called upon to help. There are a lot of secrets revealed in Rage of a Demon King. Some of the more mysterious figures who have inhabited Feist's books are finally seen in a clearer light. The origins of Macros the Black and Miranda are revealed. Plus, Nakor's "secret", that there is no magic, is explained.

== Plot ==
Set right after Rise of a Merchant Prince, the story opens with Rupert Avery and Erik Von Darkmoor returning from their second voyage in the southern continent Novindus. Erik goes off to undertake more training for recruits, and returns to Kitty, who form a relationship. Word reaches that the entire continent of Novindus has fallen, despite their previous efforts to sabotage and delay the movement of the Emerald Queen's army. Roo similarly returns to his relationship with Sylvia, the beautiful daughter of Jacob Esterbrook. After returning, Erik is poisoned, but the quick thinking of Kitty saves him.

Knight-Marshal William, Duke James and Prince Patrick shape up the defense for the Kingdom. The plan was to sacrifice Krondor and push the invaders to a 'soft' centre. They would defend the ground, shredding as many enemies as possible. On Nightmare Ridge, a huge fortification was constructed in tandem with the heavily fortified city of Darkmoor, with roads running the length to deliver supplies. Meanwhile Pug and Miranda seek Macros, and use the powers of the Spellweavers in Elvandar to find him assimilating godhood as Sarig, the God of Magic. Pug sunders the link, and Macros returns to his human form.

Duke James and Roo arrange a deal with the Quegans, which ultimately resulted in the Quegans believing that a treasure fleet would be coming their way. Six hundred ships of the Emerald Queen herald the start of the invasion. Pug is persuaded by Miranda to destroy the fleet, however Pug fails to do so. The fleet was magically protected and Pug almost died after his own fireball turned on him. It is also revealed that the Emerald Queen was in fact a demon in disguise. He heals in Elvandar for a couple of months.

The Kingdom's navy headed by Admiral Nicholas, plus the Keshians and Quegans duped into attacking the fleet ends up destroying a quarter of the fleet, but Nicholas is fatally shot by an arrow. Krondor's harbour is blown up by the Pantathians, and the palace is soon destroyed resulting in Knight-Marshal William's death. Duke James conducts the defense of Krondor underground with the Mockers, however he stays behind with Gamina as the explosions consume Krondor. Pug discovers a demon that is possessed by the Saaur's last Loremaster, Hanam. Both of them, Miranda and Macros destroy the rifts that feed the demons into Midkemia and Shila, however Macros sacrifices himself to defeat the demon King Maarg and Hanam dies in the process.

As Krondor falls, Erik heads the defences in the centre. All consumables and goods of value were destroyed to prevent the enemy from gaining advantage. Every town lent support, yet when it was overrun, it was put to the torch. Finally the Kingdom Army barely holds off at Nightmare Ridge and Darkmoor. Pug and Calis journey to Sethanon, and begins to unlock the Lifestone. The demon Jakan furiously transports himself to Sethanon, while ordering a full scale attack on the Kingdom Army. Jakan appears in the chamber of the Lifestone, but the combined efforts of Tomas, Pug and Miranda destroy Jakan. Eventually the defenses at Nightmare Ridge fail, and the city of Darkmoor is overrun. Just when the citadel of Darkmoor falls, Nakor and a magician from Stardock intervene and use weather magic to create a storm of snow. The last Saaur are relocated to the plateaus northeast of the continent Triaga. The remnants of the Emerald Queen flee to the city of Ylith, where they rewinter and plan to retake the Kingdom.

== Reception ==
A Publishers Weekly review called the book's depiction of the fall of Krondor "gripping" but added that it was let down by "a pedestrian use of language and antiquated images of women".
