= Janny Wurts =

American novelist and illustrator (born 1953)

- Born: December 10, 1953 (age 72); Bryn Mawr, Pennsylvania, U.S.
- Occupations: Author, illustrator
- Spouse: Don Maitz
- Writing career
- Genre: Fantasy
- Notable works: Wars of Light and Shadow, Empire trilogy
- Website: paravia.com/JannyWurts/

Janet Inglis "Janny" Wurts (born December 10, 1953) is an American fantasy novelist and illustrator. She has written several standalone novels and series, including the Wars of Light and Shadow, The Cycle of Fire trilogy and the internationally best-selling Empire trilogy that she co-authored with Raymond E. Feist. Her short story collection That Way Lies Camelot was nominated for the British Fantasy Award in 1995. She often illustrates her own books, and has won Chesley Awards for her artwork.

== Biography ==
Janny Wurts was born in Bryn Mawr, Pennsylvania. In the 1980s, she worked as an illustrator for role-playing game supplements for Mayfair Games.

Wurts has written numerous novels (20 as of 2024). Her fantasy debut Sorcerer's Legacy (1982) has been described as a political thriller; it features a female protagonist and court intrigue. Similar elements feature in the Empire trilogy, written in collaboration with Raymond E. Feist. Empire is set in a non-European culture that has drawn comparisons to feudal Japan and the Byzantine empire. Wurts has also written science fantasy: her Cycle of Fire trilogy mixes magic with science fiction. The Wars of Light and Shadow is Wurts' 11-volume epic fantasy series with a storyline that spans multiple millennia and planets.

Beyond writing, Wurts' award-winning paintings have been showcased in exhibitions of imaginative artwork, among them a commemorative exhibition for NASA's 25th Anniversary; the Art of the Cosmos at Hayden Planetarium in New York; and two exhibits of fantasy art, at both the Delaware Art Museum and Canton Art Museum.

Wurts was a guest of honor at the 1996 World Horror Convention and the 2004 World Fantasy Convention. She resides in Florida with her husband, artist Don Maitz.

== Bibliography ==
=== The Cycle of Fire Trilogy ===
- Stormwarden (1984)
- Keeper of the Keys (1988)
- Shadowfane (1988)
  - The Cycle of Fire (1999) collects the trilogy into one volume

=== The Empire Trilogy ===
- Daughter of the Empire (1987) with Raymond E. Feist
- Servant of the Empire (1990) with Raymond E. Feist
- Mistress of the Empire (1992) with Raymond E. Feist

=== The Wars of Light and Shadow ===
- Arc I
  - Curse of the Mistwraith (1993)
- Arc II
  - Ships of Merior (1994)
  - Warhost of Vastmark (1995)
- Arc III: Alliance of Light
  - Fugitive Prince (1997)
  - Grand Conspiracy (1999)
  - Peril's Gate (2001)
  - Traitor's Knot (2004)
  - Stormed Fortress (2007)
- Arc IV: Sword of the Canon
  - Initiate's Trial (2011)
  - Destiny's Conflict (2017)
- Arc V: Song of the Mysteries
  - Song of the Mysteries (2024)

=== Stand-alone novels ===
- Sorcerer's Legacy (1982)
- Master of Whitestorm (1992)
- To Ride Hell's Chasm (2002)

=== Collections ===
- That Way Lies Camelot (1994)

=== Short stories ===
- "Silverdown's Gold" (1991) appeared in Horse Fantastic
- "Blood, Oak, Iron" (2004) appeared in Flights: Extreme Visions of Fantasy
- "Child of Prophecy" (2004) appeared in Masters of Fantasy (A Wars of Light and Shadow Short Story)
- "Watchfire" (2004) with Raymond E. Feist, appeared in Flights: Extreme Visions of Fantasy
- "Last of Her Kind" (2005) appeared in Fantastic Companions
- "Finder's Keeper" (2006) appeared in Fantasy Gone Wrong
- "Moebius Trip" (2006) appeared in Elemental: The Tsunami Relief Anthology: Stories of Science Fiction and Fantasy
- "Sundering Star" (2006) appeared in Under Cover of Darkness (A Wars of Light and Shadow Short Story)
- "Reins of Destiny" (2007) appeared in The Solaris Book of New Fantasy (A Wars of Light and Shadow Short Story)
- "The Decoy" (2016) appeared in Unfettered II (A Wars of Light and Shadow Short Story)

=== Novellas ===
- The Gallant (2018) appeared in Secrets & Spells: 6 Fantasy Novels (A Wars of Light and Shadow prequel)

== Illustration work ==
- Cover art and map art for The Company War, a 1983 board game from Mayfair Games based on the novel Downbelow Station by C. J. Cherryh

Janny Wurts also painted the cover art for her US and international books. Her paintings have been showcased in numerous exhibitions and have won several Chesley awards.
