= Shadow of a Dark Queen =

1994 fantasy novel by Raymond E. Feist

- Shadow of a Dark Queen first edition cover.
- Author: Raymond E. Feist
- Cover artist: Bryan Leister
- Language: English
- Series: The Serpentwar Saga
- Genre: Fantasy
- Publisher: William Morrow & Co.
- Publication date: June 1994
- Publication place: United States
- Media type: Print (Hardback & Paperback)
- Pages: 382 (first edition)
- ISBN: 0-688-12408-9
- OCLC: 29549283
- Dewey Decimal: 813/.54 20
- LC Class: PS3556.E446 S49 1994
- Followed by: Rise of a Merchant Prince

Shadow of a Dark Queen is a fantasy novel by American writer Raymond E. Feist. It is the first book in The Serpentwar Saga and was first published in June 1994. It was followed by Rise of a Merchant Prince which was published in 1995.

== Plot introduction ==
A dark queen is gathering armies in remote lands and desperate men are sent on a suicidal mission to confront this evil. Among these men is Nakor the Isalani, a gambler who knows the true nature of the Queen and whom everyone must wager their lives upon.

== Plot summary ==
The prologue introduces the Saaur, warm-blooded humanoid reptiles, whose world is being overrun by demons from the Fifth Circle of Hell. The survivors allied themselves reluctantly with their cold-blooded cousins, the Pantathians, to escape to Midkemia in exchange for a generation of service.

The novel starts by introducing best friends Erik Von Darkmoor, an apprentice blacksmith and bastard son of the local baron, and Roo Avery, a local trouble maker. Erik's half-brother Stefan Von Darkmoor, heir to his father's title, who resents Erik's claim to the Darkmoor name, rapes Erik's close friend Rosalyn in an attempt to force Erik into a fight. Erik and Roo find Stefan, and in a rage, Erik holds Stefan down while Roo delivers the killing blow, but Erik is injured during the fight. Now wanted for Stefan's murder, the two realize they must flee, and set out for Krondor. On the way, the boys narrowly escape detection when they happen upon the tent of a strange woman named Gert who aids them. They wake the next morning to find Gert gone and a mysterious woman named Miranda in her place, who helps and heals Erik. Further on their journey, they come to the aid of a man who is being ambushed by some brigands. The man, a merchant named Helmut Grindle, guides them the rest of the way to Krondor. On their journey, Roo befriends the man, questioning him on all matters commerce with the goal of starting a business of his own.

When they arrive in Krondor there is a long line on the road into the city, due to the search for the two murderers as well as the rush to reach the city to attend the funeral of Prince Arutha. They hide in a nearby farm and then in a tavern where they are first kidnapped by local slavers, then caught by constables, and sentenced to hang. Their hanging is faked, though, along with several other condemned men, and the group is taken to a man named Robert de Loungville, where they are informed that their sentence has not been commuted, only delayed, and that they can only hope to gain freedom in exchange for service to the crown on an extremely dangerous mission. They are taken to a training camp where they are quickly trained as soldiers. There, they meet their mysterious captain for the first time, the half-elven Calis, as well as encountering Miranda again.

They sail across the Endless Sea aboard the Trenchard's Revenge and the Freeport Ranger, to the continent of Novindus, where they must pose as a mercenary group known as "Calis' Crimson Eagles" and attempt to join the army of the Emerald Queen. Their mission is to gather information and assess the Queen's motives. Her army is slowly conquering the entire continent in a bloody campaign, city by city. Meanwhile, Miranda seeks the aid of Pug in the coming conflict, forming a close bond with the great magician.

After meeting up with their allies among the natives, Calis and his band successfully infiltrate the army. They discover the Emerald Queen's plans to become a host for a Valheru spirit trapped within several ancient artifacts, then lead her army across the sea to invade the Kingdom of the Isles. When their ruse is discovered, the Crimson Eagles are pursued by the 9-foot-tall Saaur cavalry, only to flee into the secret lair of the Pantathian priests. At great cost, Calis finds his way to the inner chambers and manages to destroy the artifacts. The diminished crew manage to escape to a nearby city under siege by the Emerald Queen. They manage to destroy the shipyards, key to the Queen's plot, and while the invasion is not prevented completely, it is delayed significantly. The surviving members of the group are picked up by Prince Nicholas aboard the Freeport Ranger, and return to Krondor as free men.

== Publication history ==
Since its release in 1994 Shadow of a Dark Queen has been released in over 15 countries and in over 10 different languages. The first edition hardback and paperback releases for the United States and the United Kingdom are listed below.

- 1994, US, William Morrow & Co. ISBN 0-688-12408-9, Pub date June 1994, Hardback
- 1994, UK, HarperCollins ISBN 0-00-224147-1, Pub date July 1994, Hardback
- 1994, UK, HarperCollins ISBN 0-00-224612-0, Pub date November 1994, Trade paperback
- 1995, UK, HarperCollins ISBN 0-00-648026-8, Pub date April 24, 1995, Paperback
- 1995, US, Eos ISBN 0-380-72086-8, Pub date May 1995, Paperback
