= Talon of the Silver Hawk =

2002 novel by Raymond E. Feist

- First edition
- Author: Raymond E. Feist
- Cover artist: Martin McKenna
- Language: English
- Series: Conclave of Shadows
- Genre: Fantasy
- Publisher: HarperCollins
- Publication date: September 2002
- Publication place: United States
- Media type: Print (Hardback & Paperback)
- Pages: 378 (first edition)
- ISBN: 0-380-80324-0
- Preceded by: Krondor: Tear of the Gods
- Followed by: King of Foxes

Talon of the Silver Hawk is a fantasy novel by American writer Raymond E. Feist, the first book in the Conclave of Shadows trilogy, part of The Riftwar Cycle. It was preceded by Krondor: Tear of the Gods and is followed by King of Foxes, and concluded in Exile's Return.
