= Stormed Fortress =

Book by Janny Wurts

- First edition
- Author: Janny Wurts
- Cover artist: Janny Wurts
- Language: English
- Series: Wars of Light and Shadow
- Genre: Epic fantasy
- Publisher: HarperCollins Voyager
- Publication date: November 5, 2007
- Publication place: Great Britain
- Media type: Print
- Pages: 624
- ISBN: 978-0-00-721780-9
- OCLC: 78988634
- Preceded by: Traitor's Knot
- Followed by: Initiate's Trial

Stormed Fortress is volume eight of the Wars of Light and Shadow by Janny Wurts. It is also volume five of the Alliance of Light, the third story arc in the Wars of Light and Shadow.

Stormed Fortress is the concluding volume to the Alliance of Light, the third story arc of the Wars of Light and Shadow.

== Publication ==
This novel is currently available in the UK, Australia and New Zealand. US publication date has been set for Fall 2009.
