= Fugitive Prince =

- Author: Janny Wurts
- Cover artist: Janny Wurts
- Language: English
- Series: Wars of Light and Shadow
- Genre: Epic fantasy novel
- Publisher: HarperCollins
- Publication date: 1997
- Publication place: United States
- Media type: Print (hardback)
- Pages: 400 pp
- ISBN: 978-0-00-224076-5
- OCLC: 40589324
- Preceded by: Warhost of Vastmark
- Followed by: Grand Conspiracy

Fugitive Prince is volume four of the Wars of Light and Shadow by Janny Wurts. It is also volume one of the Alliance of Light, the third story arc in the Wars of Light and Shadow.

== Summary ==
The story follows two half-brothers, Lysaer and Arithon, who are cursed by a Mistwraith to always be in conflict. Lysaer, a leader who claims divine power, fights to protect humanity from magic he believes is dangerous. Arithon, a mage, wants to avoid war and restore peace by finding ancient races. Their rivalry worsens when a group of enchantresses supports Lysaer, leading to new tensions and the threat of another war, as the Mistwraith’s curse keeps them locked in battle.
