= Warhost of Vastmark =

- First edition
- Author: Janny Wurts
- Cover artist: Janny Wurts
- Language: English
- Series: Wars of Light and Shadow
- Genre: Epic fantasy novel
- Publisher: HarperCollins
- Publication date: 24 August 1995
- Publication place: United States
- Media type: Print (hardback)
- Pages: 370 pp
- ISBN: 978-0-00-224619-4
- OCLC: 33406160
- Preceded by: Ships of Merior
- Followed by: Fugitive Prince

Warhost of Vastmark is volume three of The Wars of Light and Shadow by Janny Wurts.

Warhost of Vastmark is the second half of Arc II of The Wars of Light and Shadow. The first half being Ships of Merior.

Note: The Warhost of Vastmark is only available in paperback as the US Hard Cover version of Ships of Merior contained all of Arc II.
