= Traitor's Knot =

- First edition
- Author: Janny Wurts
- Cover artist: Janny Wurts
- Language: English
- Series: Wars of Light and Shadow
- Genre: Epic fantasy
- Publisher: Voyager Books
- Publication date: 2004
- Publication place: United States
- Media type: Print (Hardback)
- Pages: 721 pp
- ISBN: 978-1-59222-082-3
- OCLC: 81451810
- Preceded by: Peril's Gate
- Followed by: Stormed Fortress

Traitor's Knot is volume seven of the Wars of Light and Shadow by Janny Wurts. It is also volume four of the Alliance of Light, the third story arc in the Wars of Light and Shadow.
