= At the Gates of Darkness =

2009 fantasy novel by Raymond E. Feist

- Author: Raymond E. Feist
- Language: English
- Series: The Demonwar Saga
- Genre: Fantasy
- Publisher: Harper Voyager
- Publication date: 8 Dec 2009 (ebook)
- Publication place: United States; United Kingdom
- Media type: Print (hardback & paperback)
- Pages: 322 (first edition)
- ISBN: 9780007264711
- OCLC: 440111701
- Preceded by: Rides a Dread Legion
- Followed by: A Kingdom Besieged

At the Gates of Darkness is a 2009 fantasy novel by American writer Raymond E. Feist, the second book of his Demonwar Saga and the 26th book in his Riftwar Cycle. The book continues the events of the previous novel involving Pug's battle with Belasco and the Demon Horde.

== Synopsis ==
The remnants of the Conclave of Shadows, led by Pug, struggle to defeat evil magician Belasco before the demon horde arrives in Midkemia.

== Reception ==
Publishers Weekly was critical of the book, calling it "comfort reading for Feist's longtime fans".
