= King of Foxes =

2003 novel by Raymond E. Feist

- First edition
- Author: Raymond E. Feist
- Cover artist: Martin McKenna
- Language: English
- Series: Conclave of Shadows
- Genre: Fantasy
- Publisher: HarperCollins
- Publication date: November 2003
- Publication place: United States
- Media type: Print (hardback & paperback)
- Pages: 383 (first edition)
- ISBN: 0-380-80326-7
- Preceded by: Talon of the Silver Hawk
- Followed by: Exile's Return

King of Foxes is a fantasy novel by American writer Raymond E. Feist, the second book in the Conclave of Shadows trilogy, part of The Riftwar Cycle. It was preceded by Talon of the Silver Hawk and is followed by Exile's Return.

== Reception ==
A reviewer for Publishers Weekly praised the depth of the characters, although they found Tal to be one of the least interesting characters, and wrote "The novel's relentless pace and explosive climactic battle will ensure another crowd-pleaser for Feist to add to his already impressive resume."
