= The Chaoswar Saga =

Series of novels by Raymond E. Feist

- Combined Kindle edition (2014)
- A Kingdom Besieged; A Crown Imperilled; Magician's End
- Author: Raymond E. Feist
- Country: United Kingdom
- Language: English
- Genre: Fantasy novel
- Publisher: HarperCollins
- Published: 2011-2013
- Media type: Print (hardback & paperback)
- Preceded by: The Demonwar Saga

The Chaoswar Saga is the final trilogy in the Riftwar Cycle series of fantasy novels by Raymond E. Feist.

== Concept ==
In the fantasy novels of Feist, a "riftwar" is a war between two worlds that are connected by some sort of dimensionless gap (rift). In Feist's invented history, there are several rift wars. The first, between Midkemia and Kelewan, is described in the trilogy The Riftwar Saga. Feist has confirmed that there are five riftwars in total.

This saga is the conclusion of Feist's preceding Riftwar Cycle works, and is the fifth and final Riftwar.

== Works in the series ==
=== A Crown Imperilled (2012) ===
The book was released in the United Kingdom on 30 January 2012 and in Australia on 1 February 2012.

It was released in the United States on 15 March 2012.

First editions in all three countries have a continuity error in the later parts of the book. Pug, a pivotal character in all of Feist's Riftwar novels, appears in two places at once due to an editing error.
