= Ships of Merior =

- First edition
- Author: Janny Wurts
- Cover artist: Janny Wurts
- Language: English
- Series: Wars of Light and Shadow
- Genre: Epic fantasy novel
- Publisher: HarperCollins
- Publication date: January 1994
- Publication place: United States
- Media type: Print (hardback)
- Pages: 916 pp
- ISBN: 978-0-06-105216-3
- OCLC: 31517169
- Dewey Decimal: 823/.914 20
- LC Class: PR6073.U78 S48 1995
- Preceded by: Curse of the Mistwraith
- Followed by: Warhost of Vastmark

Ships of Merior is volume two of The Wars of Light and Shadow by Janny Wurts.

Arc II of The Wars of Light and Shadow was released in several different formats. The US hard cover edition of The Ships of Merior contained the entirety of Arc II. However, due to page limits for binding of paperbacks, Arc II was released in paperback format as two separate books - the Ships of Merior being the first part of Arc II and Warhost of Vastmark being the second part of Arc II.
