= Peril's Gate =

- First edition
- Author: Janny Wurts
- Cover artist: Janny Wurts
- Language: English
- Series: Wars of Light and Shadow
- Genre: Epic fantasy novel
- Publisher: HarperCollins
- Publication date: 1 February 2001
- Publication place: United States
- Media type: Print (Hardback)
- Pages: 721 pp
- ISBN: 978-0-06-105220-0
- OCLC: 47922900
- Dewey Decimal: 823/.914 21
- LC Class: PR6073.U78 P47 2002
- Preceded by: Grand Conspiracy
- Followed by: Traitor's Knot

Peril's Gate is volume six of the Wars of Light and Shadow by Janny Wurts. It is also volume three of the Alliance of Light, the third story arc in the Wars of Light and Shadow.
