= Mistress of the Empire =

1992 novel by Raymond E. Feist and Janny Wurts

- Authors: Raymond E. Feist; Janny Wurts
- Cover artist: Don Maitz
- Language: English
- Series: Empire Trilogy
- Genre: Fantasy
- Publisher: Doubleday
- Publication date: April 1, 1992
- Publication place: United States
- Media type: Print (hardcover & paperback)
- Pages: 613
- ISBN: 0-385-24719-2
- OCLC: 24108636
- Dewey Decimal: 813/.54 20
- LC Class: PS3556.E446 M57 1992
- Preceded by: Servant of the Empire

Mistress of the Empire is a fantasy novel by American writers Raymond E. Feist and Janny Wurts. It is the third and final book in the Empire Trilogy and was published in 1992. It was preceded by Servant of the Empire, which was published in 1990.

== Plot introduction ==
After rising to power, Mara of the Acoma must now face the power of the brotherhood of assassins, the spies of rival houses, and the might of the Assembly, who see her as a threat to their power.

== Plot summary ==
In the last novel of the series, Mara's actions in the first two books come back to haunt her. Although revered by the general population as the Servant of the Empire, her enemies plot revenge.

Mara's son and heir Ayaki is killed by the Hamoi Tong in an attempt on Mara's life. Although the tong is known for preserving the secrecy of its employers, a token of the Anasati house is found in the assassin's hiding place. With her heart set on vengeance, Mara, as leader of Clan Hadama, calls for war with Clan Ionani, of which the Anasati, led by Lord Jiro, are a member. The Assembly of Magicians, "Great Ones" tasked with protecting the Empire, forbid the war, claiming the conflict would tear the Empire apart.

Two years later, an assassin of the Hamoi Tong poses as a Midkemian trader and poisons Mara with a chocolate drink. Mara's Spy Master Arakasi ruthlessly tortures the apothecary who sold the poison in order to find an antidote, and her husband Hokanu, although ambushed by assassins, manages to survive and return with the recipe. Mara survives, but her unborn child dies, and it is discovered that Mara will be able to bear only one more child. As she recovers, Arakasi is given the task of destroying the Hamoi Tong by stealing its records.

Mara gives birth to Hokanu's daughter, who is named Kasuma, but Hokanu's reluctance to accept a girl as his heir damages the intimate connection between him and Mara.

Arakasi infiltrates the tong, killing its leader and stealing the records. On delivery, it is discovered that the death of Hokanu's father, Kamatsu, had been paid for by Jiro. Mara realizes that the Great Ones forbade the war against the Anasati as a result of a centuries-long policy of keeping Tsurani culture in stagnation, as well as a fear that she will be responsible for a radical upheaval in society. Hoping to find a way to resist the Assembly, Mara commits her children to the protection of the Emperor and journeys to the heart of the Thuril Highlands and Chakaha, the city of the cho-ja, where she convinces the cho-ja to aid her. Two cho-ja mages—powerful creatures whose presence in the Empire is forbidden under the terms of an ancient treaty between the Tsurani cho-ja and the Assembly—return with her to her estates, where she immediately learns that the Emperor Ichindar has been assassinated and that all the Houses of the Empire are mobilizing for war.

Mara quickly realizes that her enemies, the Anasati foremost among them, seek to claim the Emperor's Golden Throne and that it is Jiro's intention to marry the late Emperor's daughter, Jehilia. Mara's children, trapped in the Imperial City of Kentosani, represent major threats to anyone who wishes to take the throne; in particular, because of her adoption into the Imperial Family in Servant of the Empire, Mara's twelve-year-old son, Justin, is Ichindar's closest living male relative. Allies of the Anasati are situated within immediate range of Kentosani, and although the Acoma army is able to block reinforcements, neither Mara, Hokanu, or Jiro can initiate the conflict without incurring the wrath of the Assembly. Fighting breaks out amongst other Houses, but without the involvement of the Acoma, Shinzawai, or Anasati, no definite conclusion can be reached.

Mara and Jiro are summoned to Kentosani by the Assembly; Jiro, who is several days closer, orders his allies to attack the city once he is inside, while Mara devises a way to disrupt his plans. She takes ten guards and makes her way toward Kentosani, while her oldest advisers and a large honour guard provide a distraction on the main roads. At the same time, she commands her army to attack the Anasati army, and though the Acoma are the larger force the battle is interrupted by the Great Ones, who force a withdrawal and, after questioning her Force Commander, begin to suspect her alliance with the cho-ja. They set out to find her, but in an expensive sacrifice the decoy force succeed in taunting a hot-headed Great One into destroying them all, allowing her time to avoid an Anasati ambush and enter a cho-ja hive.

Hokanu launches a mounted attack on Jiro's own honor guard, who prove ill-prepared to fight against men on horseback. Hokanu strangles Jiro, then proceeds toward Kentosani. The Great Ones, angered by Mara's new alliance, inadvertently break their treaty with the cho-ja in an attempt to kill her, and the cho-ja mages are able to transport her to the Imperial City. A marriage is hastily arranged between Justin and Jehilia, which takes place as the Great Ones try to breach wards set by the cho-ja. Justin's coronation is completed just as the Great Ones are about to break through, but, faced with a new emperor who holds the support of the temples (and the Gods), they are forced to accept Mara as Regent as well as the introduction of a new social order.

The series ends with a reunion between Mara and Kevin of Zūn, who returns to Tsuranuanni as an ambassador from The Kingdom of the Isles, unknowing that he has fathered a child, and shocked to find his son upon the Imperial Throne. Kevin and Mara, who has divorced Hokanu, quickly resume their romance.

Arakasi, Mara's Spymaster, is focused upon more in this novel: he falls in love whilst infiltrating the Hamoi Tong, and his struggle to reconcile his emotions and his profession form a running subplot.

== Reception ==
Publishers Weekly wrote, "The characters' efforts to work out their destinies within the constraints of a tradition-bound culture is depicted with skill." John C. Burnell of Dragon wrote: "For intricate strategy, clear-minded statecraft, and exotic alien magic, few writers can match the team of Feist and Wurts." However, Kirkus Reviews described the novel as written "in a style more evocative of The Hungry Caterpillar than its obvious paradigm, Shogun", and called the novel "Wearisome twaddle that just lies there, quivering feebly."
