= A Kingdom Besieged =

2011 fantasy novel by Raymond E. Feist

- Author: Raymond E. Feist
- Cover artist: Nik Keevil
- Language: English
- Series: The Chaoswar Saga
- Genre: Fantasy
- Publication date: 12 April 2011
- Publication place: United States; United Kingdom
- Media type: Print
- ISBN: 9780061468391
- Preceded by: At the Gates of Darkness
- Followed by: A Crown Imperilled

A Kingdom Besieged is a fantasy novel by American writer by Raymond E. Feist, the first book in the trilogy The Chaoswar Saga, the final saga in The Riftwar Cycle. The novel was announced by Feist on February 27, 2008, and was released on April 12, 2011.

== Plot ==
Within the Empire of Great Kesh, the Isles' spies under Jim Dasher begin disappearing without a trace, leaving the intelligence network with little reliable information. The Empire of Great Kesh and its soldiers seek to invade the West and reclaim territories that were taken from them centuries earlier. Martin conDoin is tasked with defending the Duchy of Crydee from the invading forces. In the demonic dimension, a female demon known as Child rises to prominence. With the assistance of the archivist Belog, she attempts to escape the "Darkness", a force associated with the Dread, which is consuming their world. The episode ends when they change form, taking on the appearance of two of Pug's loved ones before entering the dimension that contains Midkemia.
