= Magician's End =

2013 novel by Raymond E. Feist

- Author: Raymond E. Feist
- Cover artist: First edition
- Language: English
- Series: Chaoswar Saga
- Genre: Fantasy
- Publisher: Harper Voyager
- Publication date: 6 May 2013
- Publication place: United Kingdom; United States
- Media type: Print
- ISBN: 9780007264797
- Preceded by: A Crown Imperilled

Magician's End is a 2013 fantasy novel by American writer Raymond E. Feist, the third book in his The Chaoswar Saga trilogy and the 30th, and final, book in his Riftwar Cycle series.
