= Conclave of Shadows =

Series of fantasy novels by Raymond E. Feist

- First editions
- Talon of the Silver Hawk; King of Foxes; Exile's Return
- Author: Raymond E. Feist
- Country: United States; United Kingdom
- Language: English
- Genre: Fantasy novel
- Publisher: Avon Eos, HarperCollins
- Preceded by: The Serpentwar Saga
- Followed by: The Darkwar Saga

Conclave of Shadows is a series of fantasy novels by Raymond E. Feist, part of The Riftwar Cycle. The series picks up events following The Serpentwar Saga, and deals with the secret titular organization formed by the great magician Pug, and its initial struggle against evil necromancer Leso Varen while in the employ of Kaspar, Duke of Olasko.

== Works in the series ==
=== Talon of the Silver Hawk ===
Story of a boy, Talon of the Silver Hawk, from the mountains who has had his entire tribal race killed at the order of a Duke. Vowing revenge against the murderers of his family, he joins a secret organization known as the Conclave of Shadows, whose ultimate goal is said to oppose the evil in the world. Talon takes on a secret identity as Talwin Hawkins and the persona of a noble to gain enough fame and power to fulfill his vengeance upon his enemies. The story ends as he comes into the service of the Duke he reviles.

=== King of Foxes ===
Continues the story of Talon, or Talwin Hawkins as he has become known, under the service of Kaspar, the powerful Duke of Olasko. Talwin awaits the moment his master betrays him, believing that it is in the Duke's nature to betray, so that he may bring justice to his slaughtered people without breaking his oath of service. He gets his chance when the Duke betrays him to a neighboring King, but is exiled before he can take his revenge the Duke. Unknown to Talwin the mysterious sorcerer Leso Varen holds a strange influence over the Duke, and that much of the Duke's ambition was fuelled by Varen's machinations. After months in prison, Talwin escapes, and wages a war against his former master, ultimately destroying everything the Duke held in his power. The sorcerer meanwhile seems to meet his end at Talwin's hand during the battle. The story ends as Talwin discovers that his people have not been eliminated when he discovers a young woman from his village and her son, and takes them as wife and child. Having had enough of bloodshed, Talwin decides to banish the Duke in order to have him contemplate all he has done, now that the veil of the Sorcerer had been broken.

=== Exile's Return ===
The story of the exiled Duke and his quest to return home after being transported to the other side of the world by a magician ally of Talwin Hawkins. During his exile, he contemplates all the choices he had made as the Duke, and regrets the pain he had caused. Along his journey, he encounters four men carrying an artifact of dark power. As soon as he sees it, he is caught in its power and led by a will not his own along with his new companions to where the artifact, a set of black armor, wished. They take it to the temple of the Gods, and are directed to take it to the Gods themselves upon the highest mountains of the world. As they travel, the former Duke Kaspar's companions are killed off one at a time, until he is alone in carrying the armor to the Gods. There he is shown visions of great evil that await if the armor is not sent back to the world from which it came. To do so, Kaspar is instructed to find his old enemy, Talwin Hawkins, and contact the order he works for, the Conclave of Shadows. Kaspar takes the advice and sails the armor back to his home and does as he is bid, only to find that the Conclave know of no means to destroy the armor. Hoping to gain more information, the head of the Conclave, Pug, transports them to the elf lands of Elvandar where they seek the wisdom of the elves. Even the elves prove to be of no help, and just as the sorcerer Pug and Kaspar are to return, a reincarnated Leso Varen attacks the elven land with his hordes of undead. After saving the elf lands, they return only to find that Pug's stronghold had been breached by none other than Leso Varen himself. After a battle in which Varen is killed again, Pug and his son are able to send the armor to an Assembly of the most powerful magicians in their plane. As the story concludes, Pug and an ally of his, Nakor, travel to where the armor was first uncovered, only to find that thousands more like it were hidden only under the surface.

== Characters ==
- Talwin Hawkins (born Kielianapuna, then Talon of the Silver Hawk) was originally a part of a people who called themselves the Orosini and these resided in the 'High Fastness' mountain region beyond the eastern borders of the Kingdom of the Isles east of the Duchy of Farinda and west of County Conar. The Orosini are a simple people, and Talwin is introduced in Talon of the Silver Hawk as a boy named Kielianapuna, awaiting his vision from the gods; where he will his receive his true name. He has been waiting for two days on his vision quest, and is losing hope when he finally receives a vision when he faints and a hawk lands next to him and speaks to him. His name is revealed to him, 'Talon of the Silver Hawk'.
