= Exile's Return =

2004 novel by Raymond E. Feist

- First edition
- Author: Raymond E. Feist
- Language: English
- Series: Conclave of Shadows
- Genre: Fantasy
- Published: September 2004 HarperCollins
- Publication place: United States
- Media type: Print (Hardback & Paperback)
- Pages: 361 (first edition)
- ISBN: 9780380803279; 0380803275
- Preceded by: King of Foxes
- Followed by: Flight of the Nighthawks

Exile's Return is a fantasy novel by American writer Raymond E. Feist, the third book in the Conclave of Shadows trilogy, part of The Riftwar Cycle. It was preceded by King of Foxes and is followed by Flight of the Nighthawks.

== Plot summary ==
Kaspar, former Duke of Olasko, finds himself alone and without provisions on the continent of Novindus on the other side of the world after being removed from power by the Conclave of Shadows (in King of Foxes, the preceding novel). His desire for revenge must be put aside as he struggles to survive in a harsh unfamiliar land. He happens upon a farm, where his only choice is to work for food and shelter. As he is no longer under the magical influence of Leso Varen, the evil necromancer who had manipulated him while in Olasko, he begins to show compassion, and atone for his past deeds.

Kaspar later joins a band of traders who have been cursed with transporting a mysterious magical suit of seemingly invulnerable animated armor, which will not allow them to leave it. Kaspar discovers the armor's origin, and is tasked with returning it across the vast ocean to the Conclave, once his enemies, now his only hope to help prevent the world's destruction.

== Receptions ==
Kirkus Reviews gave a positive review, praising the pace of the novel.
