= Grand Conspiracy =

1999 book by Janny Wurts

- First edition
- Author: Janny Wurts
- Cover artist: Janny Wurts
- Language: English
- Series: Wars of Light and Shadow
- Genre: Epic fantasy novel
- Publisher: HarperCollins
- Publication date: 1999
- Publication place: United States
- Media type: Print (hardback)
- Pages: 624 pp
- ISBN: 978-0-06-105219-4
- OCLC: 41096175
- Dewey Decimal: 823/.914 21
- LC Class: PR6073.U78 G7 2000
- Preceded by: Fugitive Prince
- Followed by: Peril's Gate

Grand Conspiracy is an epic fantasy novel by Janny Wurts. It is volume five of the Wars of Light and Shadow saga. It is also volume two of the Alliance of Light, the third story arc in the Wars of Light and Shadow.

Amidst the intensifying rivalry between Prince Lysaer, the Lord of Light, and his half-brother Arithon, the Master of Shadow, the sorceresses of Koriathain plot to lure Arithon.

== Reception ==
Publishers Weekly praised the "fine climax to the novel" as well as Wurts as "an accomplished builder of worlds, scenes and characters through well-chosen detail, with an ear for dialogue and an eye for realism – her shipboard scenes, the battling street mobs and the reluctantly taxed merchants are exemplary". Library Journal also highlighted "The author's attention to detail and her skill for creating memorable heroes and villains" which "lend a sense of immediacy to a tale of epic battles and great betrayals".
