= Wrath of a Mad God =

2008 novel by Raymond E. Feist

- Wrath of a Mad God first edition cover.
- Author: Raymond E. Feist
- Cover artist: Dominic Forbes
- Language: English
- Series: Darkwar Saga
- Genre: Fantasy
- Publisher: HarperVoyager
- Publication date: March 3, 2008
- Publication place: United States; United Kingdom
- Media type: Print (hardback & paperback)
- Pages: 516 (first edition)
- ISBN: 0-00-724429-0
- Preceded by: Into a Dark Realm
- Followed by: Rides a Dread Legion

Wrath of a Mad God is a fantasy novel by American writer Raymond E. Feist. It is the third and final book in the Darkwar Saga and was published in 2008. It was preceded by Into a Dark Realm which was published in 2006. It was originally meant to be published on September 3, 2007.

== Plot introduction ==
On the world of the Dasati, Pug and the other Conclave members must find a way to save their people from the magician, Leso Varen, and the wrath of the mad god he has awoken. Miranda must find a way to save herself from the clutches of the Deathpriests who have her held captive on the world of Kelewan.

== Plot summary ==
Wrath of a Mad God finishes the Darkwar saga. Pug, Magnus, Nakor and Ralan Bek have reached the Dasati home world, and are now working with the followers of the White, what they called their pantheon of gods who were evicted from the second plane by the Dark God. Macros learns that the living Gods of Midkemia—including the Nameless—made an agreement with the gods of the second plane of reality (if they are not one and the same), and a result was that the soul of Macros was forced into the second plane of reality after his encounter and subsequent death at the hands of Maarg the demon king of the 5th plane of reality. Ralan Bek is not the God Killer, containing not a sliver of Nalar the nameless one, but he carries a sliver of the Dasati god of war to prepare the way for the true God Killer. The Dark God turns out to be an obese Dread Lord, feeding off the countless souls of the dead in the Dasati realm. The Dreadlord had previously invaded the third and fourth plane of reality, consuming all life within both realms. His ultimate goal is to devour enough souls in the second plane to transport himself into the first plane, where the world of Midkemia resides. As the invasion of Kelewan begins, the Dasati take many prisoners and throw them back through the rift to the Dasati world straight towards the waiting Dreadlord who consumes the souls of the falling bodies. The Dreadlord is eventually defeated by a combination of two factors as it tries to travel through the rift to Kelewan; the God Killer, which is revealed to be the tiny sliver of Nalar sheltered by Leso Varen, is released by Nakor in his final act and attacks the Dreadlord from behind, whilst Pug puts a rift in front of Kelewan's moon and slightly adjusts its orbit, forcing a massive chunk of rock to collide with the Dreadlord as it tries to emerge from the rift. For once, Nalar, the mad God of Evil, worked in concert with the other gods of his pantheon, to prevent the Dreadlord from subverting his role as the ultimate force for evil in the first plane of reality.

Continuing on with the two stories, one book -theme started in the preceding book, Miranda, who remained behind in the first plane of reality, escapes from the Deathpriests of the Dasati. She travels to Kelewan, and there leads the Tsurani in the defense of their, ultimately doomed, home-world.
