= Daughter of the Empire =

1987 novel by Raymond E. Feist and Janny Wurts

- First edition cover
- Authors: Raymond E. Feist; Janny Wurts
- Cover artist: Janny Wurts
- Language: English
- Series: Empire Trilogy
- Genre: Fantasy
- Publisher: Doubleday
- Publication date: May 19, 1987
- Publication place: United States
- Media type: Print (hardcover & paperback)
- Pages: 394 (first edition)
- ISBN: 0-385-23393-0
- OCLC: 15108553
- Dewey Decimal: 813/.54 19
- LC Class: PS3556.E446 D38 1987
- Followed by: Servant of the Empire

Daughter of the Empire is a political fantasy novel by American writers Raymond E. Feist and Janny Wurts. Published in 1987, it is the first book in the Empire Trilogy and was followed by Servant of the Empire in 1990.

== Plot introduction ==
In the world of Kelewan, Mara of the Acoma must lead her followers through terror and peril while surviving the ruthless Game of the Council. Mara must plot, bend tradition, avoid assassination attempts and trade her heart for power in order to save the Acoma from destruction.

== Plot summary ==
At the age of 17, Mara's ceremonial pledge of servantship to the goddess Lashima is interrupted by the news that her father and brother have been killed in battle. Now Ruling Lady of the Acoma, Mara finds that not only are her family's longtime enemies, the powerful Minwanabi, responsible for the deaths of her loved ones, but her military forces have been decimated by the Minwanabi betrayal and House Acoma is vulnerable to utter destruction. An immediate assassination attempt thwarted, Mara relies on the loyalty and advice of her military commanders Keyoke and Papewaio, her former nurse Nacoya, and her own wits to find solutions that will stave off the enemies who would see her ruined.

Mara bends tradition to suit her needs by contriving a way to recruit grey warriors — the former soldiers of fallen Houses, traditionally outcast — to bolster the ranks of her army. Among them is the Spy Master Arakasi, whose network of informants had failed to save his former Lord from destruction at the hands of the Minwanabi, but remains intact and at his disposal. Mara makes an alliance with the Queen of a new colony of cho-ja, an insectoid species comprising both fierce warriors and gifted artisans, improving both her military might and potential wealth from cho-ja exports.

Mara also arranges a political marriage with her family's second most powerful enemy, the Anasati. Given a choice between the second and third Anasati sons, she makes the surprising choice of Buntokapi, the third son, generally regarded as incompetent and brutish. After their marriage, Buntokapi reveals himself to be a strong military leader and much smarter than others have given him credit for, but also proves to be both an abusive husband and a somewhat inept ruling lord. Mara becomes pregnant with an heir, securing her alliance with the Anasati, and sets in motion the rest of her plan; falling prey to her machinations, Buntokapi finds himself forced to commit ritual suicide to save his honor. Finally, facing Lord Jingu of the Minwanabi himself on his own estates at a celebration attended by the many noble families of Kelewan, Mara avoids assassination and turns the tables to contrive Jingu's own "honorable" suicide, avenging her father and brother.

== Reception ==
Publishers Weekly called Daughter of the Empire a "full-bodied dynastic fantasy" with "the sweep and drama of a good historical novel about an exotic time and place." A column in Vector compared the first book to "a female Shōgun with fantasy/SF elements" and praised its characterization. Marilyn K. Sheddan of the Orlando Sentinel wrote that Feist and Wurts have "combined their considerable story-telling talents to forge a tale of war, political intrigue and love." A review in Asimov's Science Fiction was more negative, stating that while the novel had a Japanese influence, it was "a little too Japanese to feel like an original recipe, but not Japanese enough to be believable".
