= A Crown Imperilled =

2012 novel by Raymond E. Feist

- Author: Raymond E. Feist
- Language: English
- Series: Chaoswar Saga
- Genre: Fantasy
- Publisher: Harper Voyager
- Publication date: 30 January 2012
- Publication place: United Kingdom; United States
- Media type: Print
- ISBN: 9780061468421
- Preceded by: A Kingdom Besieged
- Followed by: Magician's End

A Crown Imperilled (US: A Crown Imperiled) is a fantasy novel by American writer Raymond E. Feist, the second in The Chaoswar Saga trilogy, which is the final saga in The Riftwar Cycle. The novel was released on January 30, 2012.

== Plot summary ==
The Empire of Great Kesh has risen in battle against the western lands of The Kingdom of the Isles on Midkemia while palace coups take place in Roldem and Rillanon, Jim Dasher's intelligence network has been dismantled and minor noblemen threaten the thrones of the West. Pug and the Conclave of Shadows suspect another player is behind the events.

As Pug and his son Magnus work to unravel the plot to plunge the world into chaos, they discover an island civilization of Pantathian serpent men, and are startled to find that these Pantathians have a refined culture and social structure, unlike any they have encountered before. Deepening the mystery is a mysterious energy matrix that Pug and Magnus feel certain they must decipher.

Hal, now Duke of Crydee after his father's recent death, though he is not initially aware of this fact, is given the task of protecting Princess Stephané of Roldem, along with his friend and rival Ty Hawkins of Olasko, and Stephané's bodyguard Gabriella, as they flee Roldem following a coup attempt. Along the journey, Hal and Stephané begin to fall in love, though Hal knows his rank and station would never allow them to be married. Meanwhile, Kesh has pushed the Kingdom armies in the West to the strategic city of Ylith, where Hal's younger brothers Martin and Brendan try desperately to hold the city against the siege.

Child and Belog, two demons from the fifth circle of Hell, having been mysteriously implanted with the memories of Miranda and Nakor – Pug's slain wife and close friend, respectively – have assumed Miranda and Nakor's forms as well, and seek out Pug and the Conclave in order to assist with the looming crisis. Along the way, they find themselves in Ylith, where they aid the Kingdom in its defense, and are joined by the elf prince Calis and Arkan, a dark elf also seeking Pug. After Ylith's immediate future is secured, the four make their way to Sorcerer's Isle and eventually reunite with Pug and the Conclave, though because of their true nature, the reunion is strained, especially for Magnus.

In the war between Kesh and the Kingdom, a truce is called suddenly, and their rulers gather in Roldem to discuss terms. At the evening's banquet, though, shadowy supernatural assassins known as Death Dancers are unleashed, and only the skills of Hal, Ty, Jim Dasher, and his Roldemish counterpart and lover Lady Franciezka are able to save the rulers of the three nations. Agreements are reached, and the rulers return to their kingdoms, but King Gregory of the Isles, already in poor health, dies with no heirs, leading to a potential war of succession, and puts Hal's life in danger as a cousin to the king.

Meanwhile, the magicians' combined efforts are eventually able to make progress with the matrix, but when they delve too deep, they set off a trap, creating a cataclysmic release of energy, obliterating the island and everyone on it, and summoning every dragon on the world from their slumber.

== Errata ==
All first editions contain a continuity error in the later parts of the book where the character Pug is shown to be in two places simultaneously. This was an error in the editing process and was corrected in later editions.
