= Wars of Light and Shadow =

Series of fantasy novels by Janny Wurts

The Wars of Light and Shadow is a series of fantasy novels by American author Janny Wurts. It consists of eleven volumes grouped into five story arcs.

== Background ==
The series was inspired by a documentary about the Battle of Culloden Moor. Wurts initially planned to write a heroic fantasy about war, but after watching the film, felt that the brutality and bloodshed depicted therein belied the notion of a "righteous battle for a grandiose cause". She then decided to write a more gritty, realistic tale in which the lines between good and evil were blurred.

== Books ==
The Wars of Light and Shadow follows the lives of two half-brothers with magic powers (one brother has the power to control light, while the other has the power to control darkness). They are rivals forced to join together against a supernatural invader, which in turn curses the two brothers to wage war against each other for centuries. The tale is divided into five arcs as detailed below.

- Arc 1 (1993)
  - Curse of the Mistwraith
- Arc 2 (1994—1995)
  - Ships of Merior
  - Warhost of Vastmark
- Arc 3: Alliance of Light (1997—2007)
  - Fugitive Prince
  - Grand Conspiracy
  - Peril's Gate
  - Traitor's Knot
  - Stormed Fortress
- Arc 4: Sword of the Canon (2011—2017)
  - Initiate's Trial
  - Destiny's Conflict
- Arc 5 (2024)
  - Song of the Mysteries

=== Short stories ===
- The Gallant

This novella describes how Verrain sen Dient became apprenticed to the Fellowship of Seven. It was originally published by Cornucopia Press in the Spells and Secrets anthology.

- Child of Prophecy

This short story tells of events in the life of Meiglin s'Dieneval before the rebellion. It was originally printed in the Masters of Fantasy anthology and is also available as a digital book on the author's website.

- Reins of Destiny

This short story tells the tale of Kayjon sen'Davvis and his courageous acts during the rebellion that dethroned the High King of Havish. It was originally printed in The Solaris Book of New Fantasy, and is also available as digital book on the author's website.

- The Decoy

This short story tells of Falion sen Ardhai and his mission to bear a message to the Queen-Regent Cindein s'Ilessid in the period leading up to the rebellion.

- The Sundering Star

This short story tells the tale of a WorldFleet officer and Koriani initiate, Jessian, and her actions on the planet of Scathac, long before the start of the main story. It was originally printed in Under Cover of Darkness anthology, and is also available as digital book on the author's website.

- Black Bargain

This short story delves deeper into the character of Davien the Betrayer in the lead-up to the rebellion.

The author has provided a recommended reading order for the short stories:

- The Gallant can be read at any time, independent of the main series.
- Child of Prophecy, Reins of Destiny, and The Decoy should be read anytime after Curse of the Mistwraith, and can be read in any order.
- The Sundering Star is best read after Warhost of Vastmark.
- Black Bargain is best read after Stormed Fortress.

== Characters and setting ==
=== Characters ===
==== Old bloodlines ====
Selected families ruled Athera in the early Third Age. Their rule was toppled by the rebellion incited by Davien the Betrayer in 5018. Their descendants hold out to this day as barbarians, living in forests where they are chased by the towns' headhunters.

- s'Ahelas -- Family name for the royal line appointed by the Fellowship Sorcerers in Third Age Year One to rule the High Kingdom of Shand. The half-brothers Arithon s'Ffalenn and Lysaer s'Ilessid have the same s'Ahelas mother. Gifted geas: farsight.
- s'Brydion -- Ruling line of the Dukes of Alestron. This family was the only old blood clansmen to maintain rule of a fortified city through the uprising that defeated the rule of the high kings.
- s'Callient -- Lineage of the caithdeinen of Melhalla, this family was Fellowship-chosen to succeed s'Dieneval after the fall of Tirans.
- s'Dieneval -- This family was the lost lineage of the caithdeinen of Melhalla. The bloodline carried strong talent for prophecy, and was decimated during the sack of Tirans in the uprising, with Egan s'Dieneval's pregnant wife the sole survivor. Her daughter, Meiglin was mother of Dari s'Ahelas, crown heir of Shand.
- s'Ellestrion -- Lineage of the High Kings of Melhalla, the last member of the s'Ellestrion family died in exile in the crossing the Red Desert, following the uprising.
- s'Ffalenn -- This family was the royal line appointed to rule the High Kingdom of Rathain. Arithon s'Ffalenn is the only surviving heir.
- s'Gannley -- This family bears the responsibility of caithdein for Tysan.
- s'Ilessid -- This family was the royal line appointed to rule the High Kingdom of Tysan. Lysaer s'Ilessid is one of several living heirs at the time the story begins.
- s'Lornmein -- This family was the royal line appointed to rule the High Kingdom of Havish.
- s'Taleyn -- This family bears the responsibility of caithdein for Shand.
- s'Valerient -- This family bears the responsibility of caithdein for the kingdom of Rathain.

==== Main characters ====
- Arithon s'Ffalenn — A protagonist of the series, Arithon is private, reclusive and resists closeness from most people as a result of his gifted geas of empathy. He possesses the gift of elemental shadow, allowing him to create darkness, extreme cold and shaped illusion on a scale limited only by will and imagination. Like Lysaer, Arithon's lifespan and youth is magically extended by five hundred years.
- Lysaer s'Ilessid — Another protagonist of the series, Lysaer is Arithon's opposite - charming, warm and inspiring. His gifted geas is justice, forcing him to pursue his version of justice against all odds. Lysaer's gift is of elemental light, allowing him to create intense heat and light on a similarly grand scale. Lysaer's life has been lengthened by five hundred years after drinking from Davien's Five Centuries Fountain.
- Dakar the Mad Prophet — Initially in the series, Dakar was an inveterate drunk, who befriended Lysaer and was suspicious of Arithon. Dakar has the gift of prophecy, in which he foretells a conditional future while in a trance.
- Elaira — Elaira is a member of the Koriathain Order.
- Jieret s'Valerient — Arithon's caithdein (seneschal), Jieret has known Arithon since childhood.
- Lirenda — A member of the Koriathain Order, Lirenda hates Arithon and has designed numerous traps to snare him for use by the Order.
- Morriel — The ruler of the Koriathain Order, Morriel is close to the end of an already unnaturally long life Physically weak but capable of powerful magic, she acts in what she believes to be the best interests of the humans living on Athera, to the detriment of the planet itself.

==== The Mistwraith ====
The Mistwraith is a malicious entity of parasitic wraiths that gained entry to Athera through the southern Worldsend gate. Originally, it was embodied in a world-shrouding fog that covered the entire planet.

==== Fellowship of Seven ====
The Fellowship of Seven is a group of Sorcerers bound to Athera by the summoning dream of the dragons and charged to secure the mysteries that enable Paravian survival. They achieved their redemption from Cianor Sunlord, under the Law of the Major Balance in Second Age Year One. They were the originators and keepers of the Compact made with the Paravian races to allow Mankind's settlement on Athera in Third Age Year One. Their authority backs charter law, upheld by crown justice and clan oversight of the free wilds.

Members

- Asandir — His secondary name is Kingmaker since his hand crowned every High King of Men to rule in the Third Age. After the Mistwraith's conquest, he acted as field agent for the Fellowship's doings across the continent. He is also called the Fiend-quencher, for his reputation for quelling iyats; Storm-breaker and Change-bringer for his past actions when Men first arrived upon Athera.
- Ciladis the Lost — He is the greatest healer among the Fellowship. He left the continent in Third Age 5462 in search of the Paravian races after their disappearance following the rebellion.
- Davien the Betrayer — He was responsible for provoking the great uprising in Third Age Year 5018 that resulted in the fall of the high kings after the Mistwraith's conquest. Rendered discorporate by the Fellowship's judgement in Third Age 5129, he has lived in exile since then by personal choice. Davien's works included the Five Centuries Fountain near Mearth on the splinter world of the Red Desert through West Gate; the shaft at Rockfell Peak, used by the Sorcerers to imprison harmful entities; the Stair on Rockfell Peak; and also, Kewar Tunnel in the Mathorn Mountains.
- Kharadmon — Kharadmon has been discorporate since the rise of Khadrim and Seardluin leveled Paravian stronghold at Ithamon in Second Age 3651. It was by Kharadmon's intervention that the survivors of the attack were sent to safety by means of transfer from the fifth lane power focus.
- Luhaine — Luhaine has been discorporate since the fall of Telmandir in Third Age Year 5018. Luhaine's body was pulled down by the mob while he was in ward trance, covering the escape of the royal heir of Havish.
- Sethvir — He has been The Warden of Althain Tower since Third Age 5100, when the last centaur guardian departed after the Mistwraith's conquest.
- Traithe — Traithe was solely responsible for the closing of South Gate to deny further entry to the Mistwraith. Traithe lost most of his faculties in the process and was left with a limp. Since it is not known whether he can make the transfer into discorporate existence with his powers impaired, he has retained his physical body.

Associates

- Verrain sen Dient — Master Spellbinder and Guardian of Mirthlvain, Verrain resides at Methisle Fortress and keeps watch over the dangerous predators in the swamp. He was trained by Luhaine.
- Dakar — Apprentice Spellbinder to Asandir, Dakar is sometimes called the Mad Prophet.

==== Koriathain Order ====
The Koriathain order is an ancient sisterhood that predates Athera. It is a woman-only order that binds members to the crystal matrices that they use to activate their talent. All crystals of the order are stones that were brought to Athera and, as such, are not protected under the Compact (unlike crystals mined on the planet). Koriani crystals have not given consent to their bearers to use them, as such their crystals are often chaotic and have vast trapped energies. In the case of the Great Waystone (which is the most powerful of their crystals) it carries the shades of all past, failed Matriarchs.

The sisterhood draws power from talented children foundlings. Elaira herself was a street child found by them. Male children are released from their service once they reach their majority and they leave, while the girls are bound to the order for life. The order's goal within the Wars of Light and Shadow has always been to break the Compact that prevents them from doing what they believe is their right, which is to meddle in the affairs of the world with their power. During the uprising, the Great Waystone was lost. The order sustains itself by providing acts of magic and healing, but these come with a price. Any action taken by the Koriani must be repaid in kind.

==== Paravian races ====
- Athlien Paravians — Sunchildren, akin to elves or pixies
- Ilitharis Paravians — Centaurs, though of enormous stature
- Riathan Paravians — Unicorns

=== Timeline ===
The world of Athera timeline is divided up into Eras and Ages:

- Era of Creation
- Era of Destruction (also Ages of Dragons)
- Era of Redemption is the era where the stories occur and has (currently) three ages:
  - First Age - Marked by arrival of the Paravians
  - Second Age - Marked by the arrival of the Fellowship Sorcerers
  - Third Age - Marked by the arrival of Mankind, where the main story takes place
- Era of Exaltation

The series opens in Third Age 5637. The satellite short stories to the main series take place many years prior.

=== Locations ===
- Alestron — Home of the s'Brydion family, this was one of the few cities not to fall in the uprising against the clans after the invasion of the Mistwraith.
- Althain Tower — Built in the second age by the Paravians, Althain Tower houses many records and artifacts from Athera's history, and is the current home of Sethvir of the Fellowship.
- Erdane — A significant city in Tysan.
- Etarra — A post-rebellion city in Rathain.
- Jaelot — Formerly a Second Age town, it is currently occupied by townsmen with a reputation for bad taste and bad manners.
- Marak — The world beyond the South Gate, which has been overrun by the Mistwraith.
- Methisle — The site of a keep where Verrain keeps watch on Mirthlvain Swamp.

== Reception ==
The magazine Tor.com praised Wurts' lyrical prose style and her portrayal of depth in the Wars of Light and Shadow. The reviewer commented positively on how the series "continually adds layers of meaning and complexity to everything, from the history of the world to the background of the major players and factions" as the narrative progressed.

== Sources ==
- D'Ammassa, Don (2014). Encyclopedia of Fantasy and Horror Fiction. Infobase Publishing. ISBN 978-1-4381-0909-1.
- Pringle, David, ed. (2021). The Ultimate Encyclopedia of Fantasy: The Definitive Illustrated Guide. Welbeck Publishing Group. ISBN 978-1-80279-157-0.
