= A Darkness at Sethanon =

1986 novel by Raymond E. Feist

- A Darkness at Sethanon first edition cover.
- Author: Raymond E. Feist
- Cover artist: Kinuko Y. Craft
- Language: English
- Series: The Riftwar Saga
- Genre: Fantasy
- Published: 1986 (Doubleday)
- Publication place: United States
- Media type: Print (hardback & paperback)
- Pages: 425 (first edition)
- ISBN: 0-385-19215-0
- OCLC: 11574364
- Dewey Decimal: 813/.54 19
- LC Class: PS3556.E446 D3 1986
- Preceded by: Silverthorn

A Darkness at Sethanon is a fantasy novel by American writer Raymond E. Feist, the third and final book in The Riftwar Saga, the first series of novels in The Riftwar Cycle. It describes how Murmandamus, a new prince of the Dark Brotherhood, marshals the forces of the Moredhel and invades the kingdom, with the intent of finding the Lifestone, a powerful relic with which he will be able to destroy every living thing in the world, so as to resurrect the Valheru Lords of old. Only Pug and Tomas can stop this new evil, thereby ending the Riftwar.

== Plot summary ==
Arutha, Prince of Krondor, uses an attempted assassination as a ruse to fake his own death so that he may travel north to confront Murmandamus. In his travels to the Northlands, Arutha finds his father's former enemy, Guy du Bas-Tyra, as the Protector of the city Armengar, the first location to be invaded by the dark army under Murmandamus. In an attempt to destroy a majority of the army, Guy orders the evacuation of the city, and ignites the naphtha mines below the city. Murmandamus escapes unscathed, and the army marches towards the border of the Kingdom of the Isles.

Meanwhile, Pug and Tomas begin searching the world, and eventually beyond, for the famed sorcerer Macros the Black, thought killed when he helped to destroy the rift (at the end of Magician). Macros reveals that he had put into motion a grand plot to instill Tomas with the powers of the Valheru, Ashen-Shugar, in order to turn the tides of the coming battle in their favour.

Murmandamus, having successfully overrun the border city of Highcastle, marches towards his final objective: the town of Sethanon, which lies above an ancient ruins containing an artifact of power known as the Lifestone.

Murmandamus lays siege to Sethanon, causing wholesale slaughter regardless of his own soldiers, in order to draw his necromantic power from their deaths. Steeped in power, he descends into the chamber of the Lifestone, and is confronted by Arutha, where they begin to duel. A rift begins to form within the chamber, held closed only by the magical efforts of Pug and Macros.

Arutha manages to kill Murmandamus, revealing his true form as a Pantathian impersonating a moredhel. With his death, the escaped magical energy causes the rift to open briefly, releasing a Valheru, and a life-stealing Dreadlord. Tomas, now fully embracing his Valheru heritage, battles his ancient kin, while his dragon mount fights the Dreadlord.

At the climax of the battle, Tomas stabs his sword through his enemy, and into the Lifestone, inadvertently releasing the spirits of all other Dragonlords. Their combined might, however, is no match for the Lifestone, the nexus of all life on Midkemia. They are drawn into the Lifestone and trapped for all eternity. The invasion is over.

Afterwards, Macros entrusts the guardianship of the world to Pug and Tomas, saying that his task to protect Midkemia is finished, and disappears.
