= Servant of the Empire =

1990 Book by Raymond E. Feist and Janny Wurts

- Authors: Raymond E. Feist; Janny Wurts
- Cover artist: Don Maitz
- Language: English
- Series: Empire Trilogy
- Genre: Fantasy
- Publisher: Doubleday
- Publication date: September 1, 1990
- Publication place: United States
- Media type: Print (hardcover & paperback)
- Pages: 580 (first edition)
- ISBN: 0-385-24718-4
- OCLC: 21228515
- Dewey Decimal: 813/.54 20
- LC Class: PS3556.E446 S48 1990
- Preceded by: Daughter of the Empire
- Followed by: Mistress of the Empire

Servant of the Empire is a fantasy novel by American writers Raymond E. Feist and Janny Wurts. Published in 1990, it is the second book in the Empire Trilogy, preceded by 1987's Daughter of the Empire and followed by Mistress of the Empire in 1992.

== Plot introduction ==
In the world of Kelewan, Mara of the Acoma has become a player in the Game of the Council through bloody political maneuvering. After buying a group of Midkemian prisoners-of-war, she finds one of them—Kevin of Zūn—to be a great asset in her ongoing struggle for survival and power.

== Plot summary ==
Having risen in wealth, power and social standing but still threatened by powerful enemies, Lady Mara of the Acoma is in as much danger as ever after her triumphs in Daughter of the Empire. Lord Desio of the Minwanabi, son of the defeated Lord Jingu, swears an unbreakable blood oath to the Red God of Death that he will destroy the Acoma or end his own bloodline. He enlists into this cause his cousin Tasaio, the cruel military genius who had managed to send Mara's father and brother to their deaths without breaking any laws or losing honor.

Though challenging the norms of Tsurani society had served her well, Mara remains a product of her culture and does not question many of her beliefs and conventions. Through the eyes of her Midkemian slave Kevin of Zūn, she begins to see the flaws, contradictions, limitations and potential of the Tsurani Empire—and finds Kevin, a love like she has never known. The Minwanabi plot to kill the Acoma military commander Keyoke and then force Mara into a campaign in the faraway desert lands of Dustari. Thanks to Mara's cho-ja warriors and Kevin's innovative "barbarian" tactics, Mara and her ally the Lord of the Xacatecas manage to overcome a Minwanabi ambush and secure an unprecedented treaty with the desert chiefs of Dustari. Tasaio is exiled for his failure against Mara, but ascends to Lord of the Minwanabi after Desio's death in battle on the barbarian world of Midkemia. Mara barely survives an extended overnight attack orchestrated by Tasaio and a second attack sent by powerful members of the Omechan clan who seek the office of Warlord in the Imperial capital of Kentosani. Mara continues acquiring allies and favors toward an endgame she knows is unavoidable. Her hopes of freeing Kevin from slavery are dashed by a proclamation from the Emperor Ichindar forbidding such practice, and soon she is even forced to relinquish Kevin for an Imperial exchange of prisoners with the Barbarian King. However, Mara manages to influence Ichindar and manipulate the High Council to thwart Tasaio's ambitions and destroy the Minwanabi once and for all. Mara—pregnant with Kevin's child—is named Servant of the Empire.

== Reception ==
John C. Burnell of Dragon wrote that the while the novel "avoids most of the usual problems associated with middle volumes of trilogies", Feist and Wurts "don't stop to explain some previously-covered aspects of Tsurani culture, so newcomers may feel underinformed about the insectoid cho-ja or the backgrounds of certain secondary characters." Kirkus Reviews called it "tiresome" and a "very faded carbon-copy of Shogun, with fantasy trappings tossed on."
