= Curse of the Mistwraith =

1994 novel by Janny Wurts

- First edition
- Author: Janny Wurts
- Cover artist: Janny Wurts
- Language: English
- Series: Wars of Light and Shadow
- Genre: Epic fantasy
- Publisher: HarperCollins
- Publication date: 1993
- Publication place: United States
- Media type: Print (Hardback)
- Pages: 688
- ISBN: 0-451-45306-9
- OCLC: 29741779
- Followed by: Ships of Merior

Curse of the Mistwraith is volume one of the Wars of Light and Shadow by Janny Wurts.

== Plot summary ==
Born on a splinter world, Lysaer and Arithon are half-brothers raised apart in enmity. Cast through a Worldsend Gate, they arrive in Athera, the ancient world of their ancestors cloaked in the fog of the malicious Mistwraith. Found by the Fellowship of Seven, they are urged to fulfill a prophecy which will free Athera from the Mistwraith and allow the clans of the Old Bloodlines to rule again.

Putting aside their differences in the new world, the brothers find common cause and through paired gifts of light and shadow, succeed in binding the Mistwraith with help from the Fellowship. Unbeknownst to the brothers and their Sorcerer guides, one wraith escaped containment and seeks retribution against the two. During Arithon's crowning as Athera's first High King in more than five hundred years, the wraith binds Lysaer into irrational hatred of his half-brother, a curse he transfers to Arithon after the botched ceremony. Rather than succumb to the curse, Arithon flees into a winter storm, finding solace in the outlawed clans dwelling in the forest.

Lysaer gathers an army to follow Arithon, led by the vicious bounty hunters who capture, kill and sell members of the clans. Though initially resistant to the idea of leading a guerilla war against the army, Arithon reluctantly assumes command upon realizing it is the only alternative to the extinction of the clans. The battles that ensue exact horrific slaughter on both sides, eventually resulting in a stalemate that forces Lysaer to withdraw without killing his brother. Arithon in turn has his mage-gift crippled through guilt. While Lysaer returns to the cities to muster a greater army and more support for his fratricidal war, Arithon becomes apprenticed to Athera's Masterbard, departing the clans in disguise.
