= Rides a Dread Legion =

2009 novel by Raymond E. Feist

- The first edition cover from the United Kingdom and Australia where the book was first published. Artwork is by Dominic Forbes.
- Author: Raymond E. Feist
- Cover artist: Dominic Forbes
- Language: English
- Series: Demonwar Saga
- Genre: Fantasy
- Publisher: HarperVoyager
- Publication date: March 5, 2009
- Publication place: United States
- Media type: Print (hardback & paperback)
- Pages: 366 (first edition)
- ISBN: 978-0-00-726468-1
- Preceded by: Wrath of a Mad God
- Followed by: At the Gates of Darkness

Rides a Dread Legion is a fantasy novel by American writer Raymond E. Feist. It is the first book in The Demonwar Saga and was published in 2009. It is followed by At the Gates of Darkness.

== Background ==
Rides a Dread Legion was first published in Australia and the United Kingdom at the beginning of March 2009. It was released in the United States at the end of March and in New Zealand in September 2009. It has also been translated into Dutch, Hungarian and Czech.

== Reception ==
The Independent Weekly stated that "despite the driving force of the book being a basic survival engine, there is enough brio to allow the reader to be entertained."
