= Rise of a Merchant Prince =

1995 fantasy novel by Raymond E. Feist

- Rise of a Merchant Prince first edition cover
- Author: Raymond E. Feist
- Cover artist: Geoff Taylor
- Language: English
- Series: The Serpentwar Saga
- Genre: Fantasy
- Publisher: Voyager Books
- Publication date: October 19, 1995
- Publication place: United States; United Kingdom
- Media type: Print (hardback & paperback)
- Pages: 406 (first edition)
- ISBN: 0-00-224148-X
- OCLC: 68986614
- Preceded by: Shadow of a Dark Queen
- Followed by: Rage of a Demon King

Rise of a Merchant Prince is a fantasy novel by American writer Raymond E. Feist. It is the second book of The Serpentwar Saga, preceded by Shadow of a Dark Queen and followed by Rage of a Demon King.

== Plot summary ==
Erik von Darkmoor and Rupert Avery (Roo), have returned to Krondor after serving in Calis's special unit that was sent down to the continent of Novindus.

Erik plans on staying in the army as a corporal in the coming war, and Roo states that he plans on becoming a rich trader. After being pardoned of their crimes by Borric, King of the Kingdom of the Isles, Erik and Roo begin a journey to visit their families in the town of Ravensburg. In an inn along the way, they meet one of Roo's cousins, Duncan, who decides to travel with Roo on the promise of becoming rich.

Once in Ravensburg, Erik visits his mother, who faints on the sight of him, as they were told that Erik and Roo were hanged. After a quick explanation, Erik learns from his childhood friend, Rosalyn, that Stefan von Darkmoor, who raped her, is the father of her young child. Roo meets up with his father while buying a wagon, and it is quickly apparent that Roo's father cannot bully him around anymore, and rents out his services as a teamster to Roo.

The plot centers primarily on the rise of Roo as an important merchant in Krondor. In the background we see a little of the progression of the war: Erik leaves with a group of special forces to re-infiltrate the den of the Pantathian Serpent Priests, Duke James follows Roo's rise from the sidelines, and steps in from time to time to help.

Erik invested his share of the bounty with Roo who tried to parallel import wine from his native Ravensburg into Krondor. Running afoul of the underworld guild of the Mockers, Roo lost everything and had to start from scratch again by working in Barret's Coffee House, an establishment similar to the real-world Lloyd's Coffee House. The job gave him an opportunity to have another go at business and Roo eventually becomes possibly the richest man in the Western Realm by exploiting a shortage of grain in the free cities and through it forming the Bitter Sea Trading Company.

Roo marries Karli, the daughter of his first business partner, and has a number of children but at the same time starts an affair with Sylvia Esterbrook, a callous but beautiful woman who seduces Roo under the orders of her father and Roo's principal business rival Jacob Esterbrook.

Near the end of the book, we follow the war more closely, as Miranda, Calis, Erik, and their squad find that there is a "third player" at work—someone is already slaughtering the Pantathians. It turns out to be a demon. This greatly aids their quest, as it is a tremendous distraction to the Serpents. As they delve deeper into the mountain they find that the Pantathians have used thousands of human sacrifices to infuse life force into a gem as a "key" to open the Lifestone. But Calis discovers something unexpected—the Key is not what it appears. Nor are the Dragon Lord artifacts they find. Something has contaminated them. Miranda brings the Key and a Dragon Lord helmet to Elvandar, where Pug, Tomas, and the Spellweavers attempt to discern its use. Erik tosses the rest of the artifacts into lava, which releases tremendous energy. He, Calis, and a small squad escape the mountains, but their way home is lost. They are eventually rescued by Nakor and Roo, who decided to sail to Novindus to save them.

The book ends with many unanswered questions: who is the "third party" at work? how were the artifacts corrupted and why? is another force after the Lifestone? are demons somehow involved, fooling the Pantathians?

== Reception ==
Dean Evans reviewed Rise of a Merchant Prince for Arcane magazine, rating it a 7 out of 10 overall. Evans comments that "the book is excellently written but, like an old car on a winter's morn, it takes a while to get going. But when Feist does eventually get into his narrative stride, he writes with a colourful verbosity. I'm a sucker for his sagas and this one is far from the expected gap-filling potboiler. All in all, it's a great read."

== Reviews ==
- Review by Carolyn Cushman (1995) in Locus, #416 September 1995
- Review by Jon Wallace (1954 -) (1996) in Vector 188
- Review by Alan Fraser (1996) in Vector 189, p25
- Review by Don D'Ammassa (1997) in Science Fiction Chronicle, #192 June 1997
