= Initiate's Trial =

Fantasy novel by Janny Wurts

- First edition
- Author: Janny Wurts
- Cover artist: Janny Wurts
- Language: English
- Series: Wars of Light and Shadow
- Genre: Epic fantasy
- Publisher: HarperCollins Voyager
- Publication date: October 27, 2011 (UK)
- Publication place: Great Britain
- Media type: Print
- Pages: TBA
- ISBN: 9780007384471
- Preceded by: Stormed Fortress
- Followed by: Destiny's Conflict

Initiate's Trial is volume nine of the Wars of Light and Shadow by Janny Wurts. It is the first volume of the fourth story arc, Sword of the Canon, in the Wars of Light and Shadow epic series. Destiny's Conflict is the second and concluding novel in this arc.

== Plot ==
Arithon is released from prison, but he has amnesia.
