= The Demonwar Saga =

Book series by Raymond E. Feist

- First editions
- Rides a Dread Legion; At the Gates of Darkness
- Author: Raymond E. Feist
- Country: United Kingdom
- Language: English
- Genre: Fantasy
- Publisher: HarperCollins
- Published: 2009-2010
- Media type: Print (hardback & paperback)
- Preceded by: The Darkwar Saga
- Followed by: The Chaoswar Saga

The Demonwar Saga is a series of fantasy novels by American writer Raymond E. Feist.

== Concept ==
In the fantasy novels of Feist, a "riftwar" is war between two worlds that are connected by some sort of dimensionless gap (a "rift"). In Feist's fictional universe several riftwars occur. The first riftwar, between Midkemia and Kelewan, takes place in the trilogy The Riftwar Saga. Feist has confirmed that there will be five riftwars in total. The Demonwar will be followed by the Chaoswar.
