= The Company War =

1983 board wargame

The Company War (1983)

The Company War is a 1983 board wargame published by Mayfair Games. It is based on American writer C. J. Cherryh's 1982 science fiction novel, Downbelow Station.

== Description ==
The Company War was developed by Bill Fawcett and James D. Griffin and published by Mayfair Games in 1983. Cherryh endorsed the game and contributed an introductory essay and star maps.

The game is for two to four players and can be completed in about an hour. It is played on a large board depicting Union–Alliance space with jump-points and space stations. Union and Earth Company ships, represented by counters, are moved about the board via dice. The aim of the game is to collect the most points by transporting goods between stations and destroying enemy ships.

An unofficial variant of the game (with Cherryh and Fawcett's permission), Advanced Company War, was developed by Christopher Weuve in 1997.

== Reception ==
Ryan Carroll reviewed The Company War in Ares Magazine Special Edition #2 and commented that "if you like science-fiction games or C.J. Cherryh's novels, you will enjoy this game. It could also serve as the basis for a miniatures campaign with some work, and the starmap could be adapted into a science-fiction role-playing game. The Company War game is easy to understand and challenging."

== Reviews ==
- Analog Science Fiction and Fact
