= The Serpentwar Saga =

1994–1998 novel series by Raymond E. Feist

- First edition covers (UK top two, US lower two)
- Shadow of a Dark Queen; Rise of a Merchant Prince; Rage of a Demon King; Shards of a Broken Crown
- Author: Raymond E. Feist
- Cover artist: Bryan Leister (1); Geoff Taylor (2); Liz Kenyon (3-4)
- Country: United States; United Kingdom
- Language: English
- Genre: Fantasy
- Publisher: HarperCollins
- Published: 1994-1998
- Media type: Print (hardback & paperback)
- Preceded by: Krondor's Sons
- Followed by: Conclave of Shadows

The Serpentwar Saga is a series of fantasy novels by American writer Raymond E. Feist. The novels revolve around two characters, Erik von Darkmoor and Roo Avery and also includes a host of previous characters from past novels, including Nakor, Pug, Macros the Black, Calis and Jimmy. It tells of the struggles of the Kingdom against a massive army on the distant continent of Novindus.

== Works in the series ==
=== Shadow of a Dark Queen ===
A dark queen is gathering armies in remote lands and desperate men are sent on a suicidal mission to confront this evil. Among these men is Nakor the Isalani, a gambler who knows the true nature of the Queen and Miranda whom everyone must wager their lives upon.

=== Rise of a Merchant Prince ===
This is the second novel in the series and details the rise of Roo Avery to becoming one of the richest merchants in the Kingdom, and Erik's career at soldiering.

=== Rage of a Demon King ===
This is the third novel in the series which finds the armies of Novindus reaching The Kingdom and the intervention of a new player in the war. The book was reviewed as "gripping" but containing "pedestrian use of language".

=== Shards of a Broken Crown ===
This is the final novel in the series which finds the Kingdom embroiled in a war against armies intent on taking over the Kingdom.

== Characters ==
- Erik Von Darkmoor is the illegitimate son of the local baron and a barmaid. He grew up as an apprentice blacksmith in the town of Ravensburg with his best friend Rupert "Roo" Avery, a local rogue. After the death of his former master he forms a bond with the new Blacksmith and forms a type of father-son relationship with him. He is also friendly with the baron's Swordmaster, Owen Greylock, who is impressed with Erik's skill with horses. Every time the Baron Von Darkmoor comes through Ravensburg, Erik's mother Freida would publicly press the Baron to acknowledge Erik as his son. While never admitting it, the Baron has also never refuted it, therefore Erik could continue to use the Von Darkmoor name. Erik was the strongest boy in his village and was large for his age. During one of the Baron's trips, he falls ill and has to stop in Ravensburg with his two sons, Stefan and Manfred.
- Ashen-Shugar and Tomas are two of the main characters from the Riftwar Cycle series of books. According to the books, Tomas, a human teenager from the city of Crydee, was gifted a set of gold and white armour. The armor once belonged to Ashen-Shugar, who was a Valheru that was born ages before Tomas. The Valheru, modeled after J. R. R. Tolkien's Valar by Feist, were godly beings that were some of the first to inhabit the universe created by Feist. Ashen-Shugar's powers, memories, and personality were bound to the armor when he faded away. By donning the mystical armor, an amalgam of Tomas and Ashen-Shugar was made, essentially creating a new character. Tomas's personality dominates and the new character is usually still referred to as Tomas.
