= Krondor's Sons =

Fantasy novels by Raymond E. Feist

- First edition covers.
- Prince of the Blood; The King's Buccaneer
- Author: Raymond E. Feist
- Cover artist: Prince of the Blood: Kevin Johnson (artist)|Kevin Johnson; The King's Buccaneer: Don Maitz
- Country: United States
- Language: English
- Genre: Fantasy
- Publisher: HarperCollins
- Published: 1989-1992
- Media type: Print (Hardback & Paperback)
- Preceded by: The Empire Trilogy
- Followed by: The Serpentwar Saga

Krondor's Sons is a series of fantasy novels by American writer Raymond E. Feist. The books are part of The Riftwar Cycle and set on the fictional world of Midkemia. The two novels are set between riftwars and explores Midkemia beyond the borders of the Kingdom of the Isles. The main characters are the three sons of Prince of Krondor Arutha ConDoin, Borric, Erland, and Nicholas. According to Feist, the series was originally meant to be a trilogy, with The Return of the Buccaneer being the third volume. However, following The King's Buccaneer Feist changed publishers, and his new editors wanted a brand-new series rather than a continuation of the old one.

== Works in the series ==
=== Prince of the Blood ===
This novel is about Borric and Erland conDoin's journey to the Empire of Great Kesh and their personal growth.

Meanwhile, a group of nobles plan to overthrow the Empress of Kesh, ending her bloodline, dividing the court and start a war to tear the Empire of Kesh apart. In the middle of this conflict are the two princes from Krondor, Borric and Erland. When Borric is captured and hears of the plot to kill them both, he escapes and travels back to the court to warn everyone of the traitors' plans.

=== The King's Buccaneer ===
The King's Buccaneer features Nicholas ConDoin, third son of Prince Arutha.

Nicholas, third son of Prince Arutha of Krondor, and his squire Harry are sent west to Crydee to live with Arutha's brother Martin, Duke of Crydee, and to learn more about life outside the palace walls.

Not long after their arrival in Crydee, the town is attacked by unknown forces. The castle is torched, people slaughtered and two noblewomen and several commoners are abducted. Soon they discover that the invaders have come from the Sunset Islands, a pirate stronghold. However, this is more than a simple pirate raid with the cutthroats serving a dark force threatening to end the entire world of Midkemia, something which Nicholas must confront.

== Characters ==
- Nakor is a vagrant, magician and trickster. He is of the Isalani, a race of Keshians from the province of Isalan, who are described as having tannish skin, and known both for mysticism and thievery. Nakor is an eclectic and eccentric character, with somewhat revolutionary views on energy, magic, and the "stuff" that makes up the universe. Nakor left home at the age of twelve after encountering a travelling sleight of hand magician who had no actual magical ability. Nakor left the traveller once he realised his magical ability surpassed the travellers sleight of hand.
