= Empire Trilogy =

Series of fantasy novels by Raymond E. Feist and Janny Wurts

- First edition cover of Daughter of the Empire. Art by Jenny Wurts.
- Daughter of the Empire (1987); Servant of the Empire (1990); Mistress of the Empire (1992)
- Author: Raymond E. Feist; Janny Wurts
- Cover artist: Janny Wurts; Don Maitz
- Country: United States
- Language: English
- Genre: Fantasy
- Publisher: Doubleday
- Published: 1987–1992
- Media type: Print (hardcover & paperback)
- No. of books: 3

The Empire Trilogy is a collaborative trilogy of political fantasy novels by American writers Raymond E. Feist and Janny Wurts, set in the fictional world of Kelewan. It is the second trilogy in Feist's The Riftwar Cycle.

== Novels ==
The trilogy traces the story of Mara of the Acoma's rise to power from a convent novitiate to the most powerful woman in Kelewan. These three books are contemporary to Feist's original Riftwar Saga and feature some crossover characters, mainly from Magician (1982). Mara struggles to rule her family after her father and brother are killed in a trap set by the Minwanabi, one of the most powerful families in the Empire and longtime enemies of the Acoma. Mara quickly learns how to play the Game of the Council with skill, and challenges the binding traditions of her world.

=== Daughter of the Empire (1987) ===
In the world of Kelewan, Mara of the Acoma must lead her followers through terror and peril while surviving the ruthless Game of the Council. Mara must plot, bend tradition, avoid assassination attempts, and trade her heart for power in order to save the Acoma from destruction.

=== Servant of the Empire (1990) ===
Mara of the Acoma has now become an expert player in the Game of the Council through bloody political maneuvering. After buying a group of Midkemian prisoners-of-war, she discovers one of them, Kevin of Zun, is a noble who reveals himself a great asset in regards to the Game of the Council.

=== Mistress of the Empire (1992) ===
After rising to power, Mara of the Acoma must face the power of the brotherhood of assassins, the spies of rival houses, and the might of the Assembly—who see her as a threat to their power.

== Adaptations ==
In February 2022, Six Studios acquired the rights to develop the first six novels of The Riftwar Cycle, including The Riftwar Saga and the Empire Trilogy, for television. Hannah Friedman, Jacob Pinion and Nick Bernardone are attached to write.

== Reception ==
According to scholar Jessica Dassler, the Empire trilogy was part of a feminist shift in fantasy literature following the women's movement of the 1960s. She wrote that the first book "embodied female empowerment and turning over societal norms" through the character Mara. In a Tor.com re-read of the series, author Tansy Rayner Roberts praised the way it "prioritiz[ed] the domestic and political machinations over quests and forests", which in her view differentiated it from typical epic fantasy. Publishers Weekly called Daughter of the Empire a "full-bodied dynastic fantasy" with "the sweep and drama of a good historical novel about an exotic time and place." A column in Vector compared the first book to "a female Shōgun with fantasy/SF elements" and praised its characterization. A review in Asimov's Science Fiction was more negative, stating that while the novel had a Japanese influence, it was "a little too Japanese to feel like an original recipe, but not Japanese enough to be believable". Publishers Weekly wrote of Mistress of the Empire, "The characters' efforts to work out their destinies within the constraints of a tradition-bound culture is depicted with skill." However, Kirkus Reviews described Mistress as written "in a style more evocative of The Hungry Caterpillar than its obvious paradigm, Shogun", and called the novel "Wearisome twaddle that just lies there, quivering feebly."

Daughter of the Empire and Servant of the Empire were each nominated for the Locus Award for Best Fantasy Novel. Servant of the Empire won a HOMer Award for Best Fantasy Novel in 1991.
