= Ageism =

Discrimination due to age

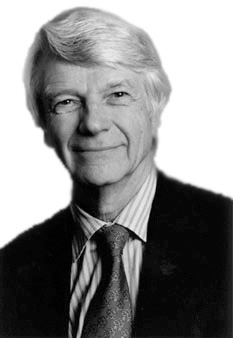
Robert N. Butler, founding director of the National Institute on Aging who coined the term "ageism"

Ageism is a type of discrimination based on one's age, generally used to refer to age-based discrimination against elderly or younger people. The term was coined in 1969 by Robert Neil Butler to describe this discrimination, building on the terminology of sexism and racism. Butler defined ageism as a combination of three connected elements: negative attitudes towards old age and the ageing process, discriminatory practices against older people, and institutional practices and policies that perpetuate stereotypes about elderly people.

The term "ageism" is also used to describe the oppression of younger people by older people. An example is a 1976 pamphlet published by Youth Liberation of Ann Arbor, Michigan. In the UK, at a meeting of the Bracknell Forest Council in June 1983, councillor Richard Thomas pointed out that age discrimination works against younger and older people. This includes the practice of denying younger people certain rights and privileges usually reserved for adults. These include the right to vote, run for political office, refuse medical treatment, and sign contracts. This definition of ageism can also include ignoring the ideas and contributions of adolescents and children because they are considered "too young" or dismissing their behavior as caused by their age. Ageism against the young also includes penalties, burdens, or requirements imposed exclusively (or to a greater degree) on young people than on older people, such as age-based military conscription.

Older people themselves can be ageist, having internalized a lifetime of negative stereotypes about aging. Ageism is often connected to fears of death and disability- with avoiding, segregating, and rejecting older people functioning as a coping mechanism to avoid these concepts. There is a large overlap between ageism and ableism, discrimination based on disability.

== Classification ==
=== Distinction from other age-related bias ===
Ageism in common linguistic and age studies usually refers to negative discriminatory practices against old people, people in their middle years, teenagers, and children. There are several forms of age-related bias. Adultism is a predisposition towards adults, which is seen as bias against children, youth, and all young people who are not addressed or viewed as adults. This includes political candidacies, jobs, and cultural settings where the supposed greater vitality and physical beauty of youth are less appreciated than the supposed greater moral and intellectual rigor of adulthood. Adultcentrism is the exaggerated egocentrism of adults. Adultocracy is the social convention which defines "maturity" and "immaturity", placing adults in a dominant position over young people, both theoretically and practically. Gerontocracy is a form of oligarchical rule in which an entity is ruled by leaders significantly older than most of the adult population. Chronocentrism is the belief that a certain state of humanity is superior to all previous and/or future times.

In 2009, Iversen, Larsen, and Solem introduced a new definition of ageism based on a conceptual analysis of the term. This definition serves as a foundation for future research on ageism. It also provides an approach to understanding the complexities of ageism. They define ageism as "negative or positive stereotypes, prejudice, and/or discrimination against (or to the advantage of) elderly people based on their chronological age or the perception of them as being 'old' or 'elderly.' Ageism can be implicit or explicit and may manifest on micro, meso, or macro levels" (Iversen, Larsen, and Solem, 2009).

Other conditions of fear or aversion associated with age groups have their own names. Paedophobia is a fear of infants and children, ephebiphobia is the fear of youth and is also referred to as an irrational fear of adolescents or a prejudice against teenagers, and gerontophobia is a fear of elderly people.

=== Implicit ageism ===
Implicit ageism refers to thoughts, feelings, and judgments that operate without conscious awareness and are automatically produced in everyday life. These may be a mixture of positive and negative thoughts and feelings, but gerontologist Becca Levy reports that they "tend to be mostly negative".

=== Stereotyping ===
Stereotyping is a tool of cognition that involves categorizing into groups and attributing characteristics to these groups. Stereotypes are necessary for processing huge volumes of information, which would otherwise overload a person. They are generally accurate descriptors of group characteristics, though some stereotypes are inaccurate. However, they can cause harm when the content of the stereotype is incorrect concerning most of the group or where a stereotype held too heavily overrides evidence which shows that an individual does not conform to it. For example, age-based stereotypes may cause one to draw very different conclusions when one sees an older and a younger adult with, for example, back pain or a limp. One might assume that following an accident, the younger person's condition is temporary and treatable, while the older person's condition is chronic and less susceptible to intervention. While this might generally be true, many elderly individuals recover quickly from accidents, and conversely, very young people—such as infants, toddlers, and small children—can become permanently disabled under similar circumstances. This assumption may not matter in casual encounters, like passing someone on the street. However, if held by healthcare professionals or managers responsible for occupational health, it could lead to inappropriate actions and age-related discrimination.

Erdman Palmore has accused managers of stereotyping older workers as being resistant to change, uncreative, cautious, slow to make judgments, lower in physical capacity, uninterested in technological change, and hard to train. Another example is when people are rude to children because of their high-pitched voices, even if they are kind and courteous. In 2009, the Journal of Management published a review of the research literature on age stereotypes in the workplace.

Contrary to more overt forms of stereotyping, such as racism and sexism, ageism tends to be more resistant to change. For example, if a child holds ageist beliefs about the elderly, they are less likely to be corrected by others. Consequently, individuals may grow up internalizing these ageist ideas, including elderly individuals themselves. In this way, ageism can become a self-fulfilling prophecy.

Ageist beliefs against the elderly are commonplace in today's society. For example, an older person who forgets something could be quick to call it a "senior moment", failing to realize the ageism of that statement. People also often utter ageist phrases such as "dirty old man" or "second childhood", and elders sometimes miss the ageist undertones.

In North America, the gap in the scores of the young and old with normal hearing was double those of the deaf. It was five times wider than those of the Chinese participants. The results show that ageism undermines ability through its self-fulfilling nature. The study was investigating the effect of the stereotype threat, a possible reason for memory deficits, though the stereotype threat has experienced criticism.

On the other hand, when elders show greater independence and control in their lives, defying ageist presumptions, they are more likely to be healthier mentally and physically than other people of similar age.

Research indicates that older people are stereotyped as scoring lower on impulsivity, activism, antagonism and openness measures, while younger people are stereotyped as scoring higher. Research finds that these stereotypes are universal across cultures and are reasonably accurate (varying depending on the assessment method and the type of stereotype), though differences were consistently exaggerated. As of 2020, there is still little research on the social status of elders across cultures.

Ageism can also manifest itself in perceptions of how dateable one is, which has culminated in terms such as the sexpiration date, which indicates the age after which one is no longer sexually appealing.

=== Prejudice ===
Ageist prejudice is often linked to the cognitive process of stereotyping. It can involve the expression of derogatory attitudes, which may lead to the use of discriminatory behavior. For example, in contests, when older or younger contestants are rejected on the belief that they are poor performers, it could be the result of stereotyping. However, older people were also voted for in a game where it made sense to target the best performers. This can only be explained by a subconscious emotional reaction to older people. In this case, the prejudice took the form of distaste and a desire to exclude oneself from the company of older people.

Stereotyping and prejudice against different groups in society do not take the same form. Age-based prejudice and stereotyping usually involve older or younger people being pitied, marginalized, or patronized. This is described as benevolent prejudice because the tendency to pity is linked to seeing older or younger people as friendly but incompetent. In the survey conducted by Age Concern, 48% of participants said that people above 70 years of age were viewed as friendly, compared to 27% who said the same about people under the age of 30. Meanwhile, only 26% believe people older than 70 are viewed as capable (with 41% saying the same about under-30s).

=== Digital ageism ===
Digital ageism refers to the prejudices faced by older adults in the digital world. An example of this could be how generational segregation naturalizes youth as digitally adept and the old as digital dunces. There is no empirical evidence for a digital divide between older and younger people. It is more accurate to say there is a digital spectrum. The experiences of older adults are often excluded from research agendas on digital media and ageism is often a factor in areas such as mass communication studies. For example, in a media diffusionist perspective, The practices of seniors are depicted as either negligible or lagging, and the equation of diffusion with individual ownership can hide practical 'workarounds' such as cell phone sharing or missed calls used by older couples on fixed incomes.

=== Ageism in statistics ===
Ageism is also inadvertently embedded in the ways statistics are collected. For example, data collected based on large age categories (e.g., "60+") often places anyone over 60 into "the grey zone" which obscures differences. The dependency ratio has been criticized by the Office of the United Nations High Commissioner for Human Rights as being based on the ageist assumption that older people are always dependent on care from younger workers.

=== Visual ageism ===
The term visual ageism was coined in 2018 by Loos and Ivan. They define visual ageism as "the social practice of visually underrepresenting older people or misrepresenting them in a prejudiced way". This is likely due to the increase in third age rhetoric in the media, picturing older people as healthy and as potential consumers, enjoying life and living their "golden years". Media representations of older people have moved from misrepresentation (negative images) to more positive depictions. Today, visual ageism in the media tends to come wrapped in the guise of the positive attributes of third-age representations of older people, while adults in their fourth-age continue to be underrepresented. One possible explanation for this is that healthy third-agers might prefer not to be associated with fourth-agers, as they remind them of what lies ahead in their own near future. Although this discomfort or even fear about mortality is undeniably common, from a societal point of view this kind of (self)ageism is hurtful to fourth agers as a group and in a sense to third agers as well, as they risk becoming fourth agers themselves one day.

== Discrimination ==
Age discrimination is the result of actions taken to deny or limit opportunities to people based on age. These are usually actions taken as a result of one's ageist beliefs and attitudes. Age discrimination occurs on both a personal and institutional level. On a personal level, an older person may be told that they are too old to engage in certain physical activities, like an informal game of basketball between friends and family. They may also be told (most common in today's Western society) that they are too old to date or to be sexually attractive to much younger people and to have a much younger partners, or encounter prejudices against age-differences in general, whether the relationship is sentimental/sexual or even platonic (this particular form of ageist bigotry and discrimination is even more relevant today or in recent times on social media, in the Left-wing socio-political sphere and in the entertainment like Hollywood's). (Note: Attributed to multiple references:)

A 2006/2007 survey done by the Children's Rights Alliance for England and the National Children's Bureau asked 4,060 children and young people whether they have ever been treated unfairly based on various criteria (race, age, sex, sexual orientation, etc.). A total of 43% of British youth surveyed reported experiencing discrimination based on their age, far eclipsing other categories of discrimination like sex (27%), race (11%), or sexual orientation (6%). Consistently, a study based on the European Social Survey found that whereas 35% of Europeans reported exposure to ageism, only 25% reported exposure to sexism and as few as 17% reported exposure to racism.

Ageism has significant effects in two particular sectors: employment and health care. Age discrimination has contributed to disparities in health between men and women. Reducing ageism and sexism would promote improved doctor-patient relationships and reduce ageist stereotypes in the healthcare industry.

=== Employment ===
The concept of ageism was originally developed to refer to prejudice and discrimination against older people and middle-aged people but has expanded to include children and teenagers. Midlife workers, on average, make more than younger workers do in income, which reflects educational achievement and experience. The age-wage peak in the United States, according to Census data, is between 45 and 54 years of age. As people age, seniority is often treated with respect, thereby lessening ageism. Seniority-based compensation has been described as discrimination based on seniority, a form of ageism, and can result in job lock and decreasing job mobility with increasing age.

Historically, younger men discriminated against younger female workers because they expected them, as young women of childbearing years, to permanently or periodically leave the workforce to have children. However, midlife female workers may also experience discrimination based on their appearance and may feel less visible and undervalued in a culture where the emphasis is on maintaining an approved standard of beauty. However, the same standard could have no effect on male colleagues of the same age.

Older people face workplace discrimination in the form of stereotypes, such as the inability to use technology and lower productivity. When applying for positions that have strong impacts, attributed stereotypes raise criticism toward their ability to function properly and efficiently. This age category of workers is often ignored and considered unable to make contributions; in some cases, they are also given unfavorable tasks that wouldn't be assigned to anyone based on their old age. Faced with discrimination in the workplace, the older generation is led to retirement around the age of 65.

Many countries have a retirement age.

The United States federal government restricts age discrimination under the Age Discrimination in Employment Act of 1967 (ADEA). The law provides certain employment protections to workers who are over the age of 40, who work for an employer who has 20 or more employees. For protected workers, the ADEA prohibits discrimination at all levels of employment, from recruitment and hiring, through the employment relationship, and through decisions for layoffs or termination of the employment relationship. An age limit may only be legally specified for protected workers in the circumstance where age has been shown to be a "bona fide occupational qualification [BFOQ] reasonably necessary to the normal operation of the particular business" (see 29 U.S.C. § 623(f)(1)). In practice, BFOQs for age are limited to the obvious (hiring a young actor to play a young character in a movie) or when public safety is at stake (for example, in the case of age limits for pilots and bus drivers). The ADEA does not stop an employer from favoring an older employee over a younger one, even when the younger one is over 40 years old.

In the UK, age discrimination against older people has been prohibited in employment since 2006. Further refinements to anti-discrimination laws occurred in 2010.

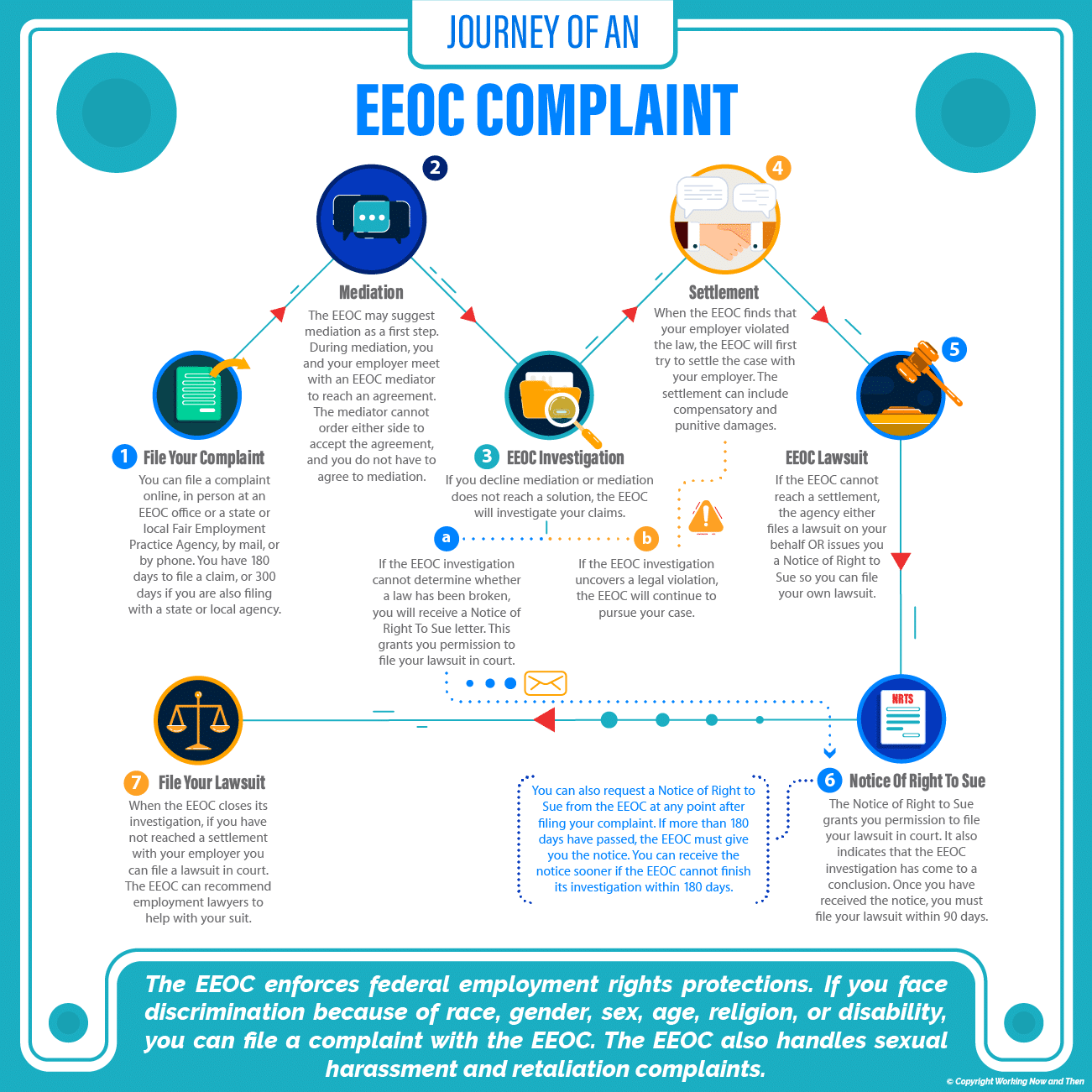
Infographic showing the process of filing an Equal Employment Opportunity Commission complaint, with age discrimination being possible grounds for EEOC intervention

Age discrimination in hiring has been shown to exist in the United States. The Equal Employment Opportunity Commission's first complainants were female flight attendants complaining of (among other matters) age discrimination. In 1968, the EEOC declared age restrictions on flight attendants' employment to be illegal sex discrimination under Title VII of the Civil Rights Act of 1964. However, Joanna Lahey, professor at The Bush School of Government and Public Service at Texas A&M, found recently that firms are more than 40% more likely to interview a young adult job applicant than an older job applicant. To fulfil job postings with youthful staff, companies turn to recruitment companies to meet their needs. Many sources place blame on recruitment practices as it is one way that age discrimination can go incognito at the hands of others. Sofica (2012) states "A study run in Washington in 1999 shows that 84% of the recruitment agencies are discriminating compared to only 29% of the companies that do their own." Dobson states that according to Weisbeck's (2017) research, "People have a natural bias to hire people like themselves" (p. 3). Lahey (2008) also stated within her research "Since it is more difficult for workers to determine why they failed to receive an interview than it is for workers to determine why they have been fired, firms that wish to retain only a certain type of worker without being sued would prefer to discriminate in the hiring state rather than at any point of the employment process" (p. 31). All states in the US prohibit youth under 14 from working with a handful of exceptions and prohibit youth under 18 from working in hazardous occupations. They are also paid a lower minimum wage and are not allowed to work full-time.

In Europe, pervasive levels of age discrimination are found in Belgium, England, France, Spain, and Sweden. Job candidates revealing older age are found to get 39% (in Belgium) to 72% (in France) less job interview invitations compared to equal candidates revealing a younger age. In addition to this, in a survey for the University of Kent, England, 29% of respondents stated that they had suffered from age discrimination. This is a higher proportion than for gender or racial discrimination. Dominic Abrams, a social psychology professor at the university, concluded that ageism is the most pervasive form of prejudice experienced in the UK population. Discrimination is found to be heterogeneous by the activity older candidates undertook during their additional post-educational years. In Belgium, they are only discriminated if they have more years of inactivity or irrelevant employment.

According to Robert M. McCann, an associate professor of management communication at the University of Southern California's Marshall School of Business, denigrating older workers, even if only subtly, can have an outsized negative impact on employee productivity and corporate profits. For American corporations, age discrimination can lead to significant expenses. In Fiscal Year 2006, the U.S. Equal Employment Opportunity Commission received nearly 17,000 charges of age discrimination, resolving more than 14,000 and recovering $51.5 million in monetary benefits. Costs from lawsuit settlements and judgments can run into the millions, most notably with the $250 million paid by the California Public Employees' Retirement System (CalPERS) under a settlement agreement in 2003.

=== Age of candidacy ===
Age of candidacy is the minimum age at which a person can legally hold certain elected government offices. In many cases, it also determines the age at which a person may be eligible to stand for an election or be granted ballot access.

Minimal age of candidacy for lower house: ≥30 25–29 21–24 / 20 18 ≤17 / No data No legislature

=== Hollywood ===
"Babe, district attorney, Driving Miss Daisy." According to Goldie Hawn’s character in The First Wives Club those are the three official ages of actresses in Hollywood.

— Los Angeles Times, 1996

Ageism in Hollywood, specifically towards women, is profound, from the way youth is praised to the lack of jobs for older actresses. The way youth is praised reflects directly on the way older women are presented in the media. President and CEO of the American Association of Advertising Agencies, O. Burtch Drake, spoke in terms of older women's representation in the media stating that "older women are not being portrayed at all; there is no imagery to worry about." Women over 50 are often not the center of attention and if an actress is older they are expected to act anything but their age. The standards set for women in film are fixated upon youth, sexuality, and beauty. Movies that portray older women acting their own age seem exaggerated and unrealistic because it does not fit the norms associated with women in film and media. As a result, older actresses face weaker employment opportunities.

Because of the limited ages the film industry portrays and the lack of older actresses, society as a whole has a type of illiteracy about sexuality and those of old age. There is an almost inherent bias about what older women are capable of, what they do, and how they feel. Amongst all ages of actresses, there is the attempt to look youthful and fit conventional beauty standards by altering themselves physically, many times through plastic surgery. Women become frightful of how they would be seen if they have wrinkles, cellulite, or any other signifier of aging. As women reach their 40s and 50s, the pressure to adhere to societal beauty norms seen in films and media intensifies in terms of new cosmetic procedures and products that will maintain a "forever youthful" look. This is evident in the rise of cosmetic botox treatments, even for individuals otherwise in good health. In terms of sexuality, older women are often portrayed as unattractive, bitter, unhappy, and unsuccessful in films. With older women not being represented in the media and film industries, specifically in Hollywood, thoughts of underachievement, ugliness, and disgust crowd the thoughts of older women as they fail to meet beauty norms. This can cause depression, anxiety, and self-esteem issues in general. In one survey, women reported feeling more embarrassed about their age than by their masturbation practices or same-gender sexual encounters.

When a woman is told by others that she is old, she can start to believe that she is. A woman can start acting as if she is older than she believes because she internalizes what other people say and think about her. In film, the female body is depicted in different states of dress and portrayed differently depending on the age of the actress. Their clothing is used as an identity marker of the character. Young women are put into revealing and sexually provocative costumes whereas older women often play the part of a mother or grandmother clad in a bonnet or apron. Aside from no longer representing the ideal female model, post-menopausal women are stereotyped as mentally unstable. "They become quarrelsome, vexatious and overbearing, petty and stingy; that is to say they exhibit typically sadistic and anal-erotic traits that they did not possess earlier" (Freud 1958,323–24).

=== Health care ===
There is considerable evidence of discrimination against the elderly in health care. This is particularly true for aspects of the physician-patient interaction, such as screening procedures, information exchanges, and treatment decisions. In the patient-physician interaction, physicians and other healthcare providers may hold attitudes, beliefs, and behaviors that are associated with ageism against older patients. Studies have found that some physicians do not seem to show any care or concern toward treating the medical problems of older people. Then, when interacting with older patients, the doctors sometimes view them with disgust and describe them in negative ways, such as "depressing" or "crazy". For screening procedures, elderly people are less likely than younger people to be screened for cancers and, due to the lack of this preventive measure, less likely to be diagnosed at early stages of their conditions.

After being diagnosed with a disease that may be potentially curable, older people are further discriminated against. Though there may be surgeries or operations with high survival rates that might cure their condition, older patients are less likely than younger patients to receive all necessary treatments. For example, health professionals pursue less aggressive treatment options in older patients, and fewer adults are enrolled in tests of new prescription drugs. It has been posited that this is because doctors fear their older patients are not physically strong enough to tolerate the curative treatments and are more likely to have complications during surgery that may end in death.

Other research studies have been done with patients with heart disease, and, in these cases, the older patients were still less likely to receive further tests or treatments, independent of the severity of their health problems. Thus, the approach to the treatment of older people is concentrated on managing the disease rather than preventing or curing it. This is based on the stereotype that it is the natural process of aging for the quality of health to decrease, and, therefore, there is no point in attempting to prevent the inevitable decline of old age.

Furthermore, caregivers further undermine the treatment of older patients by over-helping them, which may decrease independence and/or interfere with their autonomy, and by making a generalized assumption and treating all elderly people as feeble.

Differential medical treatment of elderly people can have significant effects on their health outcomes; a differential outcome which somehow escapes established protections.

In 2017, the European Court of Human Rights ruled in favor of Maria Ivone Carvalho Pinto de Sousa Morais, who had had an operation that was mishandled and rendered her unable to have sex. Portuguese judges had previously reduced damages to her in 2014, ruling then that the operation, which occurred when she was 50, had happened at "an age when sex is not as important as in younger years." The European Court of Human Rights rejected that decision, with the majority's ruling stating in part, "The question at issue here is not considerations of age or sex as such, but rather the assumption that sexuality is not as important for a 50-year-old woman and mother of two children as for someone of a younger age. That assumption reflects a traditional idea of female sexuality as being essentially linked to childbearing purposes and thus ignores its physical and psychological relevance for the self-fulfillment of women as people."

=== "Half your age plus seven rule" ===
Although this relatively recent theory supposedly originated in the West is recognized as bigoted and ageist and without actual valid basis, one "rule of thumb" to determine whether an age difference is "socially acceptable" holds that a person should never date someone whose age is less than half their own plus seven years. According to this "rule", a 28-year-old should date no one younger than 21 (half of 28, plus 7) and a 50-year-old should date no one younger than 32 (half of 50, plus 7).

Although the provenance of the rule is unclear, it is sometimes said to have originated in France. The rule appears in John Fox Jr.'s 1903 novel The Little Shepherd of Kingdom Come, in American newspapers in 1931 attributed to Maurice Chevalier, and in The Autobiography of Malcolm X, attributed to Elijah Muhammad.

The idea of the rule as a lower-bound limit reflects some contemporary redefinition. In most sources prior to the very modern era, it was not only largely heterosexual-specific and gender-specific but was presented as a formula to calculate the ideal age of a female partner at the beginning of a relationship, instead of a lower limit. Frederick Locker-Lampson's Patchwork from 1879 states the opinion "A wife should be half the age of her husband with seven years added." Max O'Rell's Her Royal Highness Woman from 1901 gives the rule in the format "A man should marry a woman half his age, plus seven." A similar interpretation is also present in the 1951 play The Moon Is Blue by F. Hugh Herbert: "Haven't you ever heard that the girl is supposed to be half the man's age, plus seven?"

A 2000 study found that the rule was fairly accurate at predicting the minimum age of a woman that a man would marry or date. However, the rule was not found to be predictive of the minimum age of a man that a woman would marry or date, nor (by reversing the formula) of the maximum age that either sex would marry or date.

This rule is equivalent to the assertion that both individuals should be at least 14 years older than their age difference.

== Effects of and major court cases/laws/regulations regarding ageism ==
Ageism has significant effects on the elderly and young people. These effects might be seen within different levels: person, selected company, whole economy. The stereotypes and infantilization of older and younger people by patronizing language affects older and younger people's self-esteem and behaviors. After repeatedly hearing a stereotype that older or younger people are useless, older and younger people may begin to feel like dependent, non-contributing members of society. They may start to perceive themselves in terms of the looking-glass self—that is, in the same ways that others in society see them. Studies have also specifically shown that when older and younger people hear these stereotypes about their supposed incompetence and uselessness, they perform worse on measures of competence and memory. These stereotypes then become self-fulfilling prophecies. According to Becca Levy's Stereotype embodiment theory, older and younger people might also engage in self-stereotypes, taking their culture's age stereotypes—to which they have been exposed over the life course—and directing them inward toward themselves. Then this behavior reinforces the present stereotypes and treatment of the elderly.

Many overcome these stereotypes and live as they choose, but it can be difficult to avoid deeply ingrained prejudice, especially if one has been exposed to ageist views in childhood or adolescence.

=== Catholic Church ===
There is no mandatory retirement age for cardinals nor for the pope, as they hold these positions for life, but cardinals aged 80 or over are prohibited from participating in the papal conclave as of 1970 because of the Ingravescentem aetatem. The Code of Canon Law specifies in Canon 401 that ordinary bishops, nuncios, and bishops with Curial appointments (but not auxiliary bishops) must present their resignation to the Pope when they turn 75, but he need not accept it right away or at all. Canon 538 makes a similar stipulation of diocesan priests who are requested, but not obliged, to offer to resign from their appointments at 75. In either case, resigning from the active exercise of the office means giving up the daily responsibilities of the offices, not ordination itself. Once a man is ordained a priest or a bishop, he retains that character until his death, whether he is still working or has since retired.

=== COVID-19 pandemic ===
Ageism during the COVID-19 pandemic, in early 2020, was primarily caused by the surfacing of data pointing the elderly as vulnerable groups. A 2020 study published in The Journals of Gerontology found that the vulnerability of older adults was seen as a problem to be solved through forced and indefinite segregation or isolation, and such measures were widely seen as acceptable by society. Older adults were often blamed for the ensuing lockdowns and restrictions. A 2021 study published in The Sociological Review characterized the treatment of elders amid the pandemic as "intergenerational discounting": "breakdown in reciprocal obligations of care, giving rise to accusations of hypocrisy, expressions of resentment and rage, and the description of the virus as the 'Boomer remover'." In particular, the study found that younger generations perceived the pandemic as comparable to climate change as a crisis and saw the disproportionate effect of COVID-19 on older generations as "karmic" due to the latter's supposed failure in mitigating climate change. The term "Boomer remover" trended on Twitter as a nickname for the disease, appearing in over 65,000 tweets by March 2020.

=== Africa ===
==== Central African Republic ====
Article 36 of the 2016 Constitution of the Central African Republic requires that candidates for President must "be aged thirty-five (35) years at least [on] the day of the deposit of the dossier of the candidature".

==== Nigeria ====
In November 2011, the Nigerian House of Representatives considered a bill that would outlaw age discrimination in employment. In September 2022, UN appointed independent human rights expert Claudia Mahler said that "as well as ageism and age-discrimination, even among Government officials, violence against older persons is an unspoken reality."

In Nigeria, a person must be at least 35 years of age to be elected President or Vice President, 35 to be a senator, 30 to be a State Governor, and 25 to be a Representative in parliament or Member of the States' House of Assembly.

==== South Africa ====
Section 47, Clause 1 of the 1996 Constitution of South Africa states that "Every citizen who is qualified to vote for the National Assembly is eligible to be a member of the Assembly", defaulting to Section 46 which "provides for a minimum voting age of 18 years" in National Assembly elections; Sections 106 and 105 provide the same for provincial legislatures.

==== Uganda ====
The Anti-Homosexuality Act, 2023 prescribes life imprisonment for sex between two people of the same biological sex and the death penalty for "aggravated homosexuality". The latter offense includes sex with persons older than seventy-five, as well as "serial offenders", same-sex rape, sex in a position of authority or procured by intimidation, sex with the disabled and mentally ill, and homosexual acts committed by a person with a previous conviction of homosexuality.

=== Americas ===
==== Belize ====
According to the Constitution of Belize, a person must be at least 18 years old to be elected as a member of the House of Representatives and must be at least 30 to be Speaker of the House. A person must be at least 18 years old to be appointed to the Senate and must be at least 30 to be president or vice-president of the Senate. As only members of the House of Representatives are eligible to be appointed prime minister, the Prime Minister must be at least 18 years old. A person must also be at least 18 years old to be elected to a village council.

==== Brazil ====
The Constitution of Brazil says in Article 40, Paragraph 1, Item II, that all public servants in the Union, States, Cities and the Federal District shall mandatorily retire at the age of 75. This regulation encompasses servants from the executive, legislative and judicial branches. It also applies to the Supreme Federal Court Justices, as per Article 93, Item VI, of the Constitution, and the Court of Accounts of the Union Judges, as stated in Article 73, Paragraph 3 of the Constitution (disposition added after the 20th Amendment).

Along with this, the Constitution of Brazil (Article 14, Section 3 (VI)) defines 35 years as the minimum age for someone to be elected president, vice-president or Senator; 30 years for state Governor or Vice-Governor; 21 for Federal or State Deputy, Mayor or Vice-Mayor; and 18 for city Council member.

==== Canada ====
Section 15 (1) of the Canadian Charter of Rights and Freedoms states that "every individual is equal before and under the law and has the right to equal protection and equal benefit of the law without discrimination and, in particular, without discrimination based on ... age" (as well as other protected classes).

In Canada, Article 718.2, clause (a)(i), of the Criminal Code defines as aggravating circumstances, among other situations, "evidence that the offense was motivated by ... age".

Ontario (Human Rights Commission) v Etobicoke (Borough of), [1982] 1 S.C.R. 202, is a Supreme Court of Canada decision on age discrimination. Harold Hall and Vincent Gray were firemen in the borough of Etobicoke, Ontario. As part of the collective agreement between the borough and the union, all firefighters were required to retire at the age of 60. When Hall and Grey were forced to retire, they brought a complaint for age discrimination under section 4(1) of the Ontario Human Rights Code which prohibited discrimination in recruitment or dismissal based on age among other grounds. The Court found that the employer did not sufficiently justify the policy as a bona fide occupational requirement.

McKinney v University of Guelph [1990] 3 SCR 229 is the Supreme Court of Canada case that decided that, for the purpose of determining the application of the Canadian Charter of Rights and Freedoms, universities were not part of government. Therefore, the mandatory retirement age for university teachers did not violate equality rights under section 15 of the Charter. In reaching this holding, the Court refined the scope of the Charter as it applies to government bodies as well as the definition of "law" within the ambit of the Charter.

Douglas/Kwantlen Faculty Assn v Douglas College, [1990] 3 S.C.R. 570 is a Supreme Court of Canada decision regarding the jurisdiction of an administrative tribunal. Douglas College's collective agreement included a provision for mandatory retirement at age 65. Two professors challenged this provision before the labour arbitration tribunal, claiming it violated the equality rights guarantee under section 15(1) of the Canadian Charter of Rights and Freedoms. The professors argued that the college constituted a public institution and therefore was subject to the Charter, and that the collective agreement constituted "law" within meaning of the Charter. The arbitrator agreed and found that the law violated section 15(1) of the Charter. The school appealed the decision on the grounds that the tribunal did not have jurisdiction to determine the constitutional issue. The British Columbia Court of Appeal found that the tribunal had jurisdiction and upheld the decision of the tribunal. The school appealed the decision in the Supreme Court of Canada. Justice La Forest, writing for the majority, dismissed the appeal by the college. The majority held that although a tribunal has the power to treat any invalid law that it may be asked to apply as having no force or effect, it may not necessarily be able to apply the Charter or grant a remedy under section 24(1) of the Charter. A tribunal only has power to the extent that it has been conferred to it by law.

Mandatory retirement was largely ended in Canada in December 2011, but as of 2012 74% of Canadians still considered age discrimination to be a problem. Retirement age for Canadian airline pilots is provided by each airline with some set to age 60, but changes to the Canadian Human Rights Act have restricted the retirement age set by the airlines. All judges in Canada are subject to mandatory retirement, at 70 or 75 depending on the court. Federal senators cease to hold their seats at 75.

In Canada, to be eligible to run for elected office (municipal, provincial, federal) one must be a minimum of 18 years or older on the day of the election. Prior to 1970, the age requirement was 21 along with the voting age. However, to be appointed to the Senate (Upper House), one must be at least 30 years of age, must possess land worth at least $4,000 in the province for which they are appointed, and must own real and personal property worth at least $4,000, above their debts and liabilities.

==== Chile ====
In Chile the minimum age required to be elected President of the Republic is 35 years on the day of the election. Before the 2005 reforms the requirement was 40 years, and from 1925 to 1981 it was 30 years. For senators it is 35 years (between 1981 and 2005 it was 40 years) and for deputies it is 21 years (between 1925 and 1970 it was 35 years).

==== Colombia ====
Measures taken to prevent the spread of COVID-19 were especially strict on older people in Colombia. The government prohibited anyone over 70 years of age from leaving their house. Amid public backlash, the restriction was taken to court and overturned.

==== Mexico ====
In Mexico, a person must be at least 35 to be president, 25 to be a senator, or 21 to be a Congressional Deputy, as specified in the 1917 Constitution of Mexico.

==== United States ====
In the United States, each state has its own laws regarding age discrimination, and there are also federal laws. In California, the Fair Employment and Housing Act forbids unlawful discrimination against persons aged 40 and older. The FEHA is the principal California statute prohibiting employment discrimination, covering employers, labor organizations, employment agencies, apprenticeship programs and/or any person or entity who aids, abets, incites, compels, or coerces the doing of a discriminatory act. In addition to age, it prohibits employment discrimination based on race or color; religion; national origin or ancestry, disability, mental type or medical condition; marital status; sex or sexual orientation; and pregnancy, childbirth, or related medical conditions. Although there are many protections for age-based discrimination against older workers (as shown above), there are less protections for younger workers.

The District of Columbia and twelve states (California, Florida, Iowa, Hawaii, Kansas, Louisiana, Maine, Minnesota, Nebraska, New Mexico, New York, and Vermont) define age as a specific motivation for hate crimes.

The federal government restricts age discrimination under the Age Discrimination in Employment Act of 1967 (ADEA). That law provides certain employment protections to workers who are over the age of 40, who work for an employer who has twenty or more employees. For protected workers, the ADEA prohibits discrimination at all levels of employment, from recruitment and hiring, through the employment relationship, and through decisions for layoffs or termination of the employment relationship. An age limit may only be legally specified for protected workers in the circumstance where age has been shown to be a "bona fide occupational qualification [BFOQ] reasonably necessary to the normal operation of the particular business" (see 29 U.S.C. § 623(f)(1)). In practice, BFOQs for age are limited to the obvious (hiring a young actor to play a young character in a movie) or when public safety is at stake (for example, in the case of age limits for pilots and bus drivers). The ADEA does not stop an employer from favoring an older employee over a younger one, even when the younger one is over 40 years old.

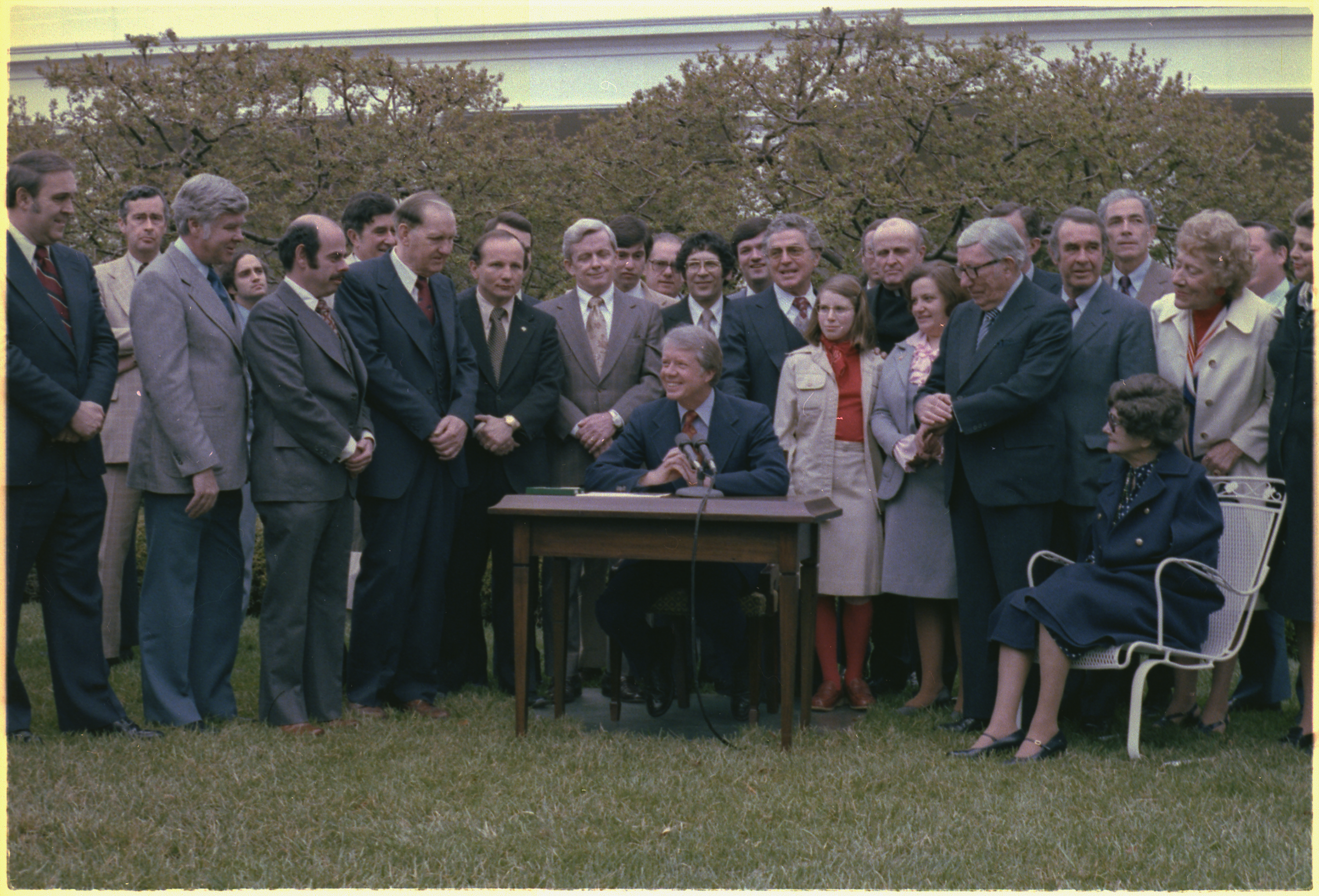
President Jimmy Carter signing legislation against mandatory retirement in 1978

Mandatory retirement due to age is generally unlawful in the United States, except in certain industries and occupations that are regulated by law and are often part of the government (such as military service and federal police agencies, such as the Federal Bureau of Investigation). Minnesota has statutorily established mandatory retirement for all judges at age 70 (more precisely, at the end of the month a judge reaches that age). The Minnesota Legislature has had the constitutional right to set judicial retirement ages since 1956, but did not do so until 1973, setting the age at 70. In 1978 President Jimmy Carter signed a law banning employers from requiring most employees to retire because of age before age 70 and ending mandatory retirement for most federal employees. The Federal Age Discrimination in Employment Act, which became law in 1986, ended mandatory age-related retirement at age 70 for many jobs, not including the Minnesota judiciary; another exception was all postsecondary institutions (colleges, etc.). This exception ended on 31 December 1993. The Fair Treatment for Experienced Pilots Act (Public Law 110–135) went into effect on 13 December 2007, raising the mandatory retirement age for pilots to 65 from the previous 60. Air traffic controllers have a mandatory retirement age of 56, with exceptions up to age 61. Most air traffic controllers are hired before the age of 31 (the hiring cutoff age for those with experience is 36). Foreign Service employees at the Department of State have a mandatory retirement age of 65 with very narrow exceptions. Federal law enforcement officers, national park rangers and firefighters have a mandatory retirement age of 57, or later if they have had less than 20 years of service. For Florida Supreme Court justices, the Florida Constitution establishes mandatory retirement at age 70. Michigan judges of all levels cannot run for election after passing the age of 70. In the New Hampshire Constitution, Article 78 sets the retirement of all judges and sheriffs at age 70. The New Jersey Supreme Court has established mandatory retirement at age 70. The Maryland Constitution establishes a mandatory retirement age of 70 for Circuit and Appellate Court judges. Oregon has a mandatory judicial retirement age of 75.

In the United States, a person must be aged 35 or over to serve as president. To be a senator, a person must be aged 30 or over. To be a Representative, a person must be aged 25 or older. This is specified in the U.S. Constitution. Most states in the U.S. also have age requirements for the offices of Governor, State Senator, and State Representative. Some states have a minimum age requirement to hold any elected office (usually 21 or 18).

In September 2016, California passed state bill AB-1687, an anti-ageism law taking effect on 1 January 2017, requiring "commercial online entertainment employment" services that allow paid subscribers to submit information and resumes (such as IMDbPro), to honor requests to have their ages and birthdays removed. The bill was supported by SAG-AFTRA's former and current presidents Ken Howard and Gabrielle Carteris, who felt that the law would help to reduce ageism in the entertainment industry. On 23 February 2017, U.S. District Judge Vince Girdhari Chhabria issued a stay on the bill pending a further trial, claiming that it was "difficult to imagine how AB 1687 could not violate the First Amendment" because it inhibited the public consumption of factual information. In February 2018, Girdhari ruled that the law was unconstitutional, arguing that the state of California "[had] not shown that partially eliminating one source of age-related information will appreciably diminish the amount of age discrimination occurring in the entertainment industry." The ruling was criticized by SAG-AFTRA, alleging that the court "incorrectly concluded there were no material disputed factual issues, while precluding the parties from acquiring additional evidence or permitting the case to go to trial". The ruling was eventually appealed, but the Ninth Circuit Court of Appeals upheld it in 2020.

==== Venezuela ====
In Venezuela, a person must be at least 30 to be President or Vice President, 21 to be a deputy for the National Assembly and 25 to be the Governor of a state.

=== Asia and Oceania ===
==== Australia ====
In regard to employment, discrimination on the basis of age is illegal in each of the states and territories of Australia. At the national level, Australia is party to a number of international treaties and conventions that impose obligations to eliminate age discrimination. The Australian Human Rights Commission Act 1986 established the Australian Human Rights Commission and bestows on this Commission functions in relation to a number of international treaties and conventions that cover age discrimination. During 1998–1999, 15% of complaints received by the Commission under the Act were about discrimination on the basis of age.

Age discrimination laws at the national level were strengthened by the Age Discrimination Act 2004, which helps to ensure that people are not subjected to age discrimination in various areas of public life, including employment, the provision of goods and services, education, and the administration of Australian government laws and programs. The Act, however, does provide for exemptions in some areas, as well as providing for positive discrimination, that is, actions which assist people of a particular age who experience a disadvantage because of their age. In 2011, the position of Age Discrimination Commissioner was created within the Australian Human Rights Commission. The Commissioner's responsibilities include raising awareness among employers about the beneficial contributions that senior Australians as well as younger employees can make in the workforce. Every state in Australia has a probationary plate system for driver which is a known exemption to the Age Discrimination Act which allows different treatment in certain circumstances. Another exception is running for office; in Australia a person must be aged 18 or over to stand for election to public office at federal, state or local government level. The Electoral Act 1918 was amended (in 1973) to reduce the age of candidacy for the House of Representatives from 21 to 18.

Compulsory retirement is generally unlawful throughout the various State and Territory jurisdictions in Australia. Among exceptions to the general rule, permanent members of the Australian Defence Force must retire at the age of 60 and reservists at 65. As well, since the passage of a constitutional amendment in 1977, judges on federal courts are required to retire at the age of 70.

The Australian Human Rights Commission has conducted a number of research projects on ageism including What's Age Got to do with it in 2021, Employing and retaining older workers in 2021 and the Willing to Work: Healthy Ageing Paper in 2016. Other active organizations include EveryAge Counts and the Council on the Ageing.

==== China ====
In China the minimum age to be elected as president or vice-president is 45. Only citizens who have reached the age of 18 have the right to vote and stand for election.

Chinese law is now interpreted to treat age caps as unlawful employment discrimination. Guiding Case No. 185 (2022) applies the PRC equal opportunity law’s non-exhaustive anti-discrimination rules to include age discrimination in recruitment. Under the Court’s interpretation, only qualifications such as specialization, educational background, work experience, and job skills are legitimate hiring considerations, and prohibits giving consideration to immutable traits unrelated to the job, such as age, because they are unlawful discrimination due to lack of inherent connection with the job role. The Supreme Court precedent allows individuals to challenge maximum age limits set by employers.

===== Hong Kong =====
In Hong Kong a person must be at least 21 to be candidate in a district council or Legislative Council election. A person must be at least 40 to be a candidate in the Chief Executive election, and also at least 40 to be a candidate in the election for the President of the Legislative Council from among the members of the Legislative Council.

==== Cyprus ====
In Cyprus the minimum age to be elected president is 35 years. The minimum age to run for the House of Representatives was 25 years until the Constitution was amended in 2019 to lower the limit to 21.

==== India ====
In India a person must be at least:

- 35 to be the President or Vice President, Governor, and Lieutenant Governor of the states and union territories as specified in the Constitution of India
- 30 to be a member of Rajya Sabha (the upper house of Parliament of India) and of a State Legislative Council (the upper house of a State Legislature, in those states where the legislature is bicameral).
- 25 to be the Prime Minister, Lok Sabha Speaker, Union Minister, Chief Minister, Assembly Speaker, and State Minister in the state governments. Additionally, to be a member of the Lok Sabha (the lower house of Parliament of India) and a State Legislative Assembly (the lower house or only house of a State Legislature in the states of India.)
- 21 to be the Mayor, chairperson, Head and a Member (Members are variously called Corporators/Councillors/Ward Members according to the type of their respective local bodies) of a Municipal Corporation, Municipal Council, Nagar Panchayat, District Council, Block Panchayat, and Gram Panchayat respectively.

Criticism has been on the rise to decrease the age of candidacy in India. The Young India Foundation has been working on a campaign to decrease the age of candidacy in India for MPs and MLAs to better reflect the large young demographic of India.

==== Indonesia ====
In Indonesia a person must be at least:

- 40 to be President or Vice President or has or is currently holding a position elected through general elections, including regional head elections as specified in the Constitution of Indonesia
- 30 to be Governor or Lieutenant Governor, as specified in the 2004 Regional Government Act
- 25 to be Regent, Vice Regent, Mayor, or Deputy Mayor, as specified in the 2004 Regional Government Act
- 21 to be Senator or Representative in both national and local parliament, as specified in the 2008 Election Act

==== Japan ====
In Japan a person must be at least:

- 25 to be the Member of parliament of the House of Representatives with Japanese nationality, to be the Member of metropolitan, prefecture, city, town, or village with valid vote rights, or to be the Mayor
- 30 to be the Governor, or to be the Member of parliament of the House of Councillors with Japanese nationality. See also House of Peers (Japan).

==== Malaysia ====
In Malaysia a citizen shall be over 18 years of age to become a candidate and be elected to the Dewan Rakyat and Dewan Undangan Negeri, and a person shall be over 30 to be the Senator by constitution.

==== New Zealand ====
In New Zealand, there is no mandatory retirement age except if working in a job that clearly specifies a mandatory retirement age.

However, the minimum age to be Prime Minister of New Zealand is 18 years old.

==== North Korea ====
In North Korea, the age for both voting and candidacy in elections to the Supreme People's Assembly is 17.

==== Pakistan ====
In Pakistan, a person must be at least 45 years old to be President. A person must be at least 25 years old to be a member of the provincial assembly or national assembly.

==== Philippines ====
At least two bills have been filed before the 16th Congress of the Philippines seeking to address age discrimination in employment in the country. The Blas Ople Policy Center, a non-governmental organization, asserts that responsibilities of making a livelihood in a household has shifted to younger members of the family due to bias against hiring people older than 30 years of age. The organization also added that age discrimination contributes to the unemployment rate and acts as a hurdle to inclusive growth in the country. Overseas Filipino Workers returning from abroad seeking to find work in the country were tagged as vulnerable to age discrimination.

Employees working in the government, who can retire as early as age 60, have a set mandatory retirement age of 65. Personnel including officials of the Philippine Armed Forces, the Philippine Coast Guard, the Philippine National Police, the Bureau of Fire Protection, and the Bureau of Jail Management and Penology are required to retire once they reach age 56. Judges are subject to mandatory retirement at 70.

In the private sector, it is illegal for employees and executives in the private sector to be forced to retire before age 65 with the exception of underground miners who are required to retire at age 60, and professional racehorse jockeys at age 55.

There are required ages for various political offices, as shown below:

Ages of candidacy in the Philippines
Type of candidate	Minimum age
President and Vice President	40
Senator	35
Member of the House of Representatives	25
Member of the Bangsamoro Parliament	25
Provincial-level elected official	23
City-level elected official in Highly Urbanized Cities	23
Mayor or Vice Mayor of all other cities or municipalities	21
Member of Sangguniang Panlungsod or Sangguniang Bayan in all other cities or municipalities	18
Barangay-level elected official (except for Sangguniang Kabataan)	18
Member of Sangguniang Kabataan	15 (Also, the maximum age of candidacy for this position is 21.)

==== Singapore ====
In Singapore a person must be at least 45 years old to run for president. 21-year-olds can stand in parliamentary elections.

==== South Korea ====
No kid zones are areas that prohibit children from being on the premises. No kid zones may be enforced by public venues and private businesses. Such zones began to proliferate in South Korea in the early 2010s. Around this time, a number of court rulings held businesses at least partially responsible after children were injured on the premises. For example, in 2013, a business was held liable after a 10-year-old child bumped into a store employee carrying hot water, which resulted in the child being burned. According to the Jeju Research Institute, there are 542 no kid zones. Other businesses may restrict customers of other ages such as teenagers or seniors. No kid zones are controversial in South Korea. Some view the zones as discriminatory and inconvenient towards women and children while others argue they are within the rights of business owners to enact.

South Korea enforces compulsory retirement before age 60 at the latest to all private companies, and 65 for public sectors. However, it is custom for most companies to lay off their employees between the ages of 50 to 55.

There are required ages for various political offices in South Korea, as shown below:

Ages of candidacy in South Korea
Type of candidate	Minimum age
President	40
Member of Parliament, Member of Legislative Assembly, Councillor	18
Mayor	18
Governor	18

==== Taiwan ====
In the Republic of China (commonly known as Taiwan), the minimum age of candidacy is 23, unless otherwise specified in the Constitution or any relevant laws. The Civil Servants Election and Recall Act specifies that candidates for township, city, and indigenous district chiefs must be at least 26, and candidates for municipality, county, and city governors must be at least 30. The minimum age to be elected as president or vice-president is 40.

==== Tibet ====
The 14th Dalai Lama was enthroned at the age of 4, and none of his predecessors have been enthroned before age 4. The coming of age for the Dalai Lama is 18, when responsibilities are assumed.

=== Europe ===
==== European Union ====
European citizenship provides the right to protection from discrimination on the grounds of age. According to Article 21–1 of the Charter of Fundamental Rights of the European Union Charter of Fundamental Rights of the European Union#III. EQUALITY, "any discrimination based on any ground such as … age, shall be prohibited".

Additional protection against age discrimination comes from the Framework Directive 2000/78/EC. It prohibits discrimination on grounds of age in the field of employment.

Mangold v Helm (2005) C-144/04 was a case before the European Court of Justice (ECJ) about age discrimination in employment. Werner Mangold was a 56-year-old German man employed on a fixed term contract in a permanent full-time job. The German government introduced the so-called Employment Promotion Act 1996 (German: Beschäftigungsförderungsgesetz) which allowed fixed term contracts for a two-year maximum and otherwise were unlawful unless they could be objectively justified. This protection was removed (apparently to "promote employment") if the employee was over 60. Further amendments then changed the age to 52. Mr. Mangold claimed that the lack of protection, over age 52, was unjustified age discrimination. The ECJ held in its judgment the German law contravened the Employment Equality Framework Directive, even though it did not have to be implemented until the end of 2006. It said that, in general terms, legislation that lets employers treat people differently because of their age "offends the principle" in international law of eliminating discrimination on the basis of age. The ECJ ruled that national courts must set aside any provision of national law which conflicts with the directive even before the period for implementation has expired.

Kücükdeveci v Swedex GmbH & Co KG (2010) C-555/07 is a leading EU labour law case, which held that there is a general principle of law in all European Union member states, against discrimination, and in favour of equal treatment. The case concerned Seda Kücükdeveci, who argued that the German service related statutory minimum notice period, because it disregarded employment before the age of 25, was unjustifiably discriminatory against young people. The European Court of Justice (Grand Chamber) held that the legislation was contrary to the Employment Equality Framework Directive 2000/78/EC but also following Mangold v Helm a general principle of equality which permeates all of EU law, to which the Directive merely gave expression. This is more so because the Charter of Fundamental Rights article 21(1) says the same and that has the same legal value as the treaties under TEU art 6(1). Accordingly, in paragraphs [23]-[31], it was held that the legislation in BGB §622 was discriminatory. There was not a sufficient objective justification for the measure, because although the German government's professed aim of wishing to bolster youth employment was legitimate, its measure was disproportionate. In paragraphs [44]-[56] the ECJ further held that national courts have a duty to disapply any provision of national legislation contrary to the principle of equal treatment. They should not be compelled to make a reference to the ECJ first. The EU law can only be applied when there is a cross-border issue.

==== Austria ====
In Austria, a person must be 18 years of age or older to stand in elections to the European Parliament or National Council. The Diets of regional Länder are able to set a minimum age lower than 18 for to be in the polls in elections to the Diet itself as well as to municipal councils in the Land. In presidential elections the candidacy age is 35.

==== Belgium ====
In Belgium, the Law of 25 February 2003 "tending to fight discrimination" punishes Ageism when "a difference of treatment that lacks objective and reasonable justification is directly based on ... age". Discrimination is forbidden when it refers to providing or offering a good or service, to conditions linked to work or employment, to the appointment or promotion of an employee, and yet to the access or participation in "an economic, social, cultural or political activity accessible to the public" (Article 2nd, § 4). Incitement to discrimination, to hatred or to violence against a person or a group on the grounds of ... age (Article 6) is punished with imprisonment and/or a fine. Nevertheless, employment opportunities are worsening for people in their middle years in many of these countries, according to Martin Kohli et al. in Time for Retirement (1991).

Only a Belgian who has reached the age of 18 years can stand for election for the Chamber of Representatives, can become a member of the Senate, or can be elected in one of the regional parliaments. This is regulated in the Constitution (Art. 64) and in the Special Law on the Reform of the Institutions.

==== Czech Republic ====
In the Czech Republic, a person must be at least 18 years old to be elected in local elections. A person must be at least 21 years old to be elected to the lower house of the Czech Parliament or to the European Parliament and 40 years old to be a member of the upper house (Senate) of the Parliament or the President of the Czech Republic.

==== Denmark ====
In Denmark, only an adult 18 years of age or older can become a candidate and be elected in any public election.

==== Estonia ====
In Estonia, only a citizen 18 years of age or older can be elected in local elections, and one must be 21 years or older for parliamentary elections. The minimum age for the President of Estonia is 40.

==== France ====
In France, Articles 225–1 through 225–4 of the penal code detail the penalization of ageism, when it comes to an age discrimination related to the consumption of goods and services, to the exercise of an economic activity, to the labor market or an internship, except in the cases foreseen in Article 225–3.

In France, only a citizen 18 years of age or older can be elected to the lower house of Parliament, and 24 years or older is required for the Senate. The minimum age for the President of France is 18.

==== Germany ====
On 18 August 2006, the General Equal Treatment Act (Allgemeines Gleichbehandlungsgesetz, AGG) came into force. The aim of the AGG is to prevent and abolish discrimination on various grounds including age.

Mangold v Helm (2005) C-144/04 was a case before the European Court of Justice (ECJ) about age discrimination in employment. Werner Mangold was a 56-year-old German man employed on a fixed term contract in a permanent full-time job. The German government introduced the so-called Employment Promotion Act 1996 (German: Beschäftigungsförderungsgesetz) which allowed fixed term contracts for a two-year maximum, and otherwise were unlawful unless they could be objectively justified. But even this protection was removed (apparently to "promote employment") if the employee was over 60. Further amendments then changed the age to 52. Mr. Mangold claimed that the lack of protection, over age 52, was unjustified age discrimination. The ECJ held in its judgment the German law contravened the Employment Equality Framework Directive, even though it did not have to be implemented until the end of 2006. It said that, in general terms, legislation that lets employers treat people differently because of their age "offends the principle" in international law of eliminating discrimination on the basis of age. The ECJ ruled that national courts must set aside any provision of national law which conflicts with the directive even before the period for implementation has expired.

Kücükdeveci v Swedex GmbH & Co KG (2010) C-555/07 is a leading EU labour law case, which held that there is a general principle of law in all European Union member states, against discrimination, and in favour of equal treatment. The case concerned Seda Kücükdeveci, who argued that the German service related statutory minimum notice period, because it disregarded employment before the age of 25, was unjustifiably discriminatory against young people. The European Court of Justice (Grand Chamber) held that the legislation was contrary to the Employment Equality Framework Directive 2000/78/EC, but also following Mangold v Helm a general principle of equality which permeates all of EU law, to which the Directive merely gave expression. This is more so because the Charter of Fundamental Rights article 21(1) says the same and that has the same legal value as the treaties under TEU art 6(1). Accordingly, in paragraphs [23]-[31], it was held that the legislation in BGB §622 was discriminatory. There was not a sufficient objective justification for the measure, because although the German government's professed aim of wishing to bolster youth employment was legitimate, its measure was disproportionate. In paragraphs [44]-[56] the ECJ further held that national courts have a duty to disapply any provision of national legislation contrary to the principle of equal treatment. They should not be compelled to make a reference to the ECJ first. The EU law can only be applied when there is a cross-border issue.

In Germany, a citizen must be 18 or over to be elected at the national level, like the Chancellor, and this age to be elected at the regional or local level. A person must be 40 or over to be President.

A 2012 study suggested that youths in Germany feel the brunt of age discrimination.

==== Greece ====
In Greece, only those aged 25 years old and over who hold Greek citizenship are eligible to stand and be elected to the Hellenic Parliament. Only those over 40 years old are eligible to stand for President of Greece.

==== Iceland ====
For the office of President of Iceland, only an Icelandic citizen who has reached the age of 35 and fulfills the requirement necessary to vote in elections to the Althing is eligible to be elected president.

==== Ireland ====
The 1937 Constitution of Ireland requires the President to be at least 35 and members of the Oireachtas (legislature) to be 21. Members of the European Parliament for Ireland must also be 21. Members of local authorities must be 18, reduced from 21 in 1973. The 1922–1937 Constitution of the Irish Free State required TDs (members of the Dáil, lower house) to be 21, whereas Senators had to be 35 (reduced to 30 in 1928). At the 1987 general election, the High Court ruled that a candidate (Hugh Hall) was eligible who reached the minimum age after the date of nomination but before the date of election. The Thirty-fifth Amendment of the Constitution Bill 2015 proposed to lower the presidential age limit to 21. However, this proposal was rejected by 73% of the voters.

The mandatory retirement age for members of the Garda Síochána with the rank of garda, inspector, and sergeant was increased from 57 years old to 60 years old in 2004. Later in 2024 it was increased for all members to 62 years old, under the An Garda Síochána Retirement Regulations 2024. Since then some members have been given permission to work until they are 64 years old.

==== Italy ====
In Italy, a person must be at least 50 to be President of the Republic, 40 to be a Senator, and 25 to be a Deputy, as specified in the 1947 Constitution of Italy. To be elected member of the Council of Regions, Provinces, and Municipalities (Communes), a candidate must be of at least 18 years of age.

In Rome, the first known example of a law enforcing age of candidacy was the Lex Villia Annalis, a Roman law enacted in 180 BCE which set the minimum age for senatorial magistrates.

==== Lithuania ====
In Lithuania a person must be at least:

- 21 to be the Member of parliament of the Seimas.
- 40 to be the President of Lithuania.

==== Luxembourg ====
In Luxembourg a person must be at least 18 years old to stand as a candidate to be a member of the Chamber of Deputies, the country's unicameral national legislature.

==== Malta ====
In Malta, the voting age was lowered to 16 in 2018 to vote in national and European Parliament elections.

==== Netherlands ====
In the Netherlands, only an adult 18 years of age or older can become elected in any public election. To be a candidate the person has to reach this age during the time for which the elections are held.

==== Norway ====
In Norway, any adult, aged 18 or over within the calendar year, can become a candidate and be elected in any public election.

==== Poland ====
There are required ages for various political offices in Poland, as shown below:

Ages of candidacy in Poland
Type of candidate	Minimum age
President	35
Senator	30
Mayor/Wójt	25
Member of the Parliament/Poseł	21
Member of the European Parliament	21
Councillor	18

==== Portugal ====
There are required ages for various political offices in Portugal, as shown below:

Ages of candidacy in Portugal
Type of candidate	Minimum age	References
President	35	
Parliament	18	

==== Russia ====
In Russia a person must be at least 35 to run for president.

==== Spain ====
Spain has two legislative chambers of Parliament, a lower house and an upper house. These are the Congress of Deputies (lower house) and the Senate of Spain (upper house) respectively. The minimum age requirement to stand and to be elected to either house is 18 years of age.

==== Sweden ====
The Swedish Discrimination Act (2008:567) was enacted in 2008 and states that: "the purpose of the Act is to combat discrimination and in other ways promote equal rights and opportunities regardless of sex ... or age."

However, only a citizen at least 18 years old, who resides, or who has resided in the realm can be elected to parliament. Citizens of Sweden, the European Union, Norway or Iceland aged 18 and over may be elected to county or municipal council. Citizens of other countries may also be elected to council, provided they have resided in the realm for at least three years.

==== Switzerland ====
In Switzerland, only a citizen aged 18 or over can become a candidate and be elected in any federal election.

==== Turkey ====
The 1876 constitution set the age for parliamentary elections as 30. This remained unchanged until 13 October 2006, when it was lowered to 25 through a constitutional amendment. In 2017, it was further lowered to 18, the same as the voting age. In presidential elections the candidacy age is 40.

==== United Kingdom ====
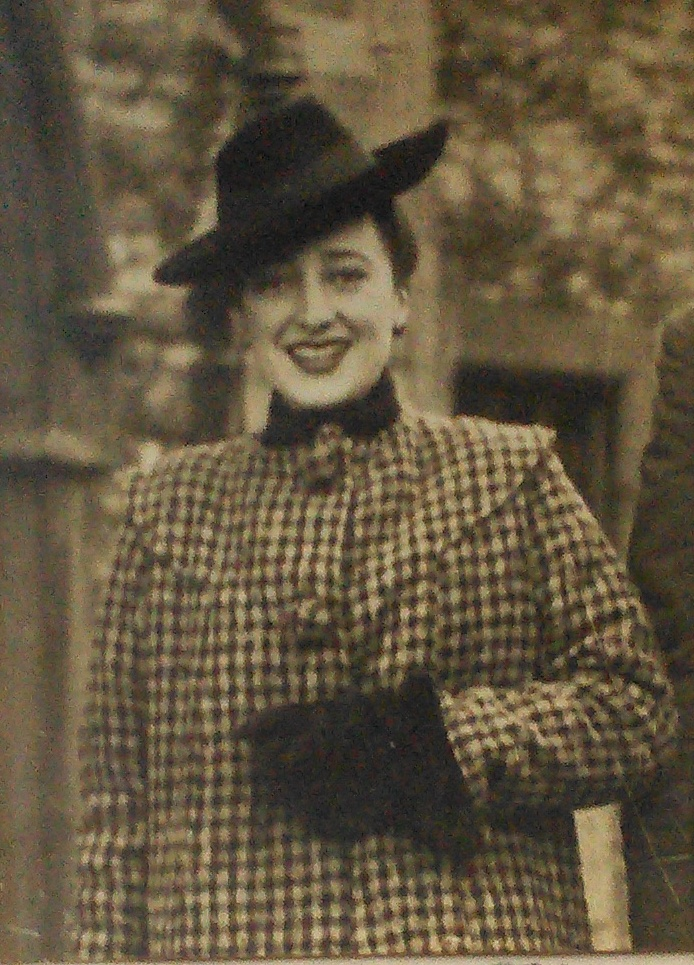
Barbara Robb, founder of the Aid for the Elderly in Government Institutions pressure group

Barbara Robb, founder of the British pressure group, Aid for the Elderly in Government Institutions (AEGIS), compiled Sans Everything: A Case to Answer, a controversial book detailing the inadequacies of care provided for older people, which prompted a nationwide scandal in the UK in 1976. Although initially official inquiries into these allegations reported that they were "totally unfounded or grossly exaggerated", her campaigns led to revealing of other instances of ill treatment which were accepted and prompted the government to implement NHS policy changes.

Councillor Richard Thomas brought up the issue of age discrimination at an early stage at a meeting of Bracknell Forest Council in March 1983. He pointed out it is a double side process, with discrimination working against both older and younger citizens.

The Judicial Pensions and Retirement Act 1993 establishes mandatory retirement for judges at the age of 75. This was increased from 70 in 2022.

A person must be aged 18 or over to stand in elections to all parliaments, assemblies, and councils within the UK, devolved, or local level. This age requirement also applies in elections to any individual elective public office; the main example is that of an elected mayor, whether of London or a local authority. There are no higher age requirements for particular positions in public office. Candidates are required to be aged 18 on both the day of nomination and the day of the poll. This was reduced from 21 by the Electoral Administration Act 2006.

In the UK, age discrimination laws were first brought into force in October 2006 and can be found in the Equality Act 2010, which implements the Equal Treatment Framework Directive 2000/78/EC and protects employees against direct discrimination, indirect discrimination, harassment and victimisation. Pursuant to the Equality Act 2010 it is generally unlawful to discriminate based upon age in the provision of goods and services.

In October 2006 with the Employment Equality (Age) Regulations 2006, the UK Labour Government introduced a Default Retirement Age, whereby employers were able to terminate or deny employment to people over 65 without a reason. A legal challenge to this failed in September 2009, although a review of the legislation was expected in 2010 by the new Conservative/Liberal Democrat coalition government. This review took place and on 17 February 2011 BIS published the draft Regulations abolishing the Default Retirement Age. Revised regulations were later implemented and, as of 6 April 2011, employers can no longer give employees notice of retirement under Default Retirement Age provisions and will need to objectively justify any compulsory retirement age still in place to avoid age discrimination claims.

There have been many notable cases and official statistics show a 37% increase in claims in 2009/10 and a further 31% increase in 2010/11. Examples include a case involving Rolls-Royce, the "Heyday" case brought by Age UK and the Miriam O'Reilly case against the BBC (2011).

The European Social Study survey in 2011 revealed that nearly two out of five people claim to have been shown a lack of respect because of their age. The survey suggested that the UK is riven by intergenerational splits, with half of the people admitting they do not have a single friend over 70; this compares with only a third of Portuguese, Swiss and Germans who say that they do not have a friend of that age or older. A Demos study in 2012 showed that three-quarters of people in the UK believed there to be not enough opportunities for older and younger people to meet and work together.

The "Grey Pride" campaign has advocated for a Minister for Older People and had some success in 2011 when former Labour Leader Ed Miliband appointed Liz Kendall as Shadow Minister for Older People.

In 2011, the artist Michael Freedman, an outspoken advocate against age discrimination within the art world, said that "I am really pissed off with the organisers of the majority of the competitions that seek artists to enter them. Many restrict entrants to those who are under 35! I have never seen a reason for this" and that "mature students, like me, come to art late in life, so why are we penalised and demotivated? Whatever happened to lifelong learning and the notion of a flexible workforce?"

=== Middle East ===
==== Iran ====
In Iran a person must be at least 21 years old to run for president.

==== Iraq ====
The Iraqi constitution states that a person must be at least 40 years old to run for president and 35 years old to be prime minister. Until 2019, the electoral law set the age limit at 30 years old for candidates to run for the Council of Representatives. However, the new Iraqi Council of Representatives Election Law (passed in 2019, yet to be enacted) lowered the age limit to 28.

==== Israel ====
A 2006 decision by Israel's High Court of Justice stated that mandatory retirement at age 67 does not discriminate against the elderly.

In Israel one must be at least 21 to become a member of the Knesset (Basic Law: The Knesset section 6(a)) or a municipality. When the Prime Minister was directly elected, one must have been a member of the Knesset who is at least 30 to be a candidate for prime minister. Every Israeli Citizen (including minors) can be appointed as a Government Minister or elected as President of Israel, but the latter role is mostly ceremonial and elected by the Parliament.

==== Palestine ====
Palestinian parliamentary candidates must be at least 28 years old, while the presidential candidates must be at least 40 years old.

== Advocacy against ageism ==
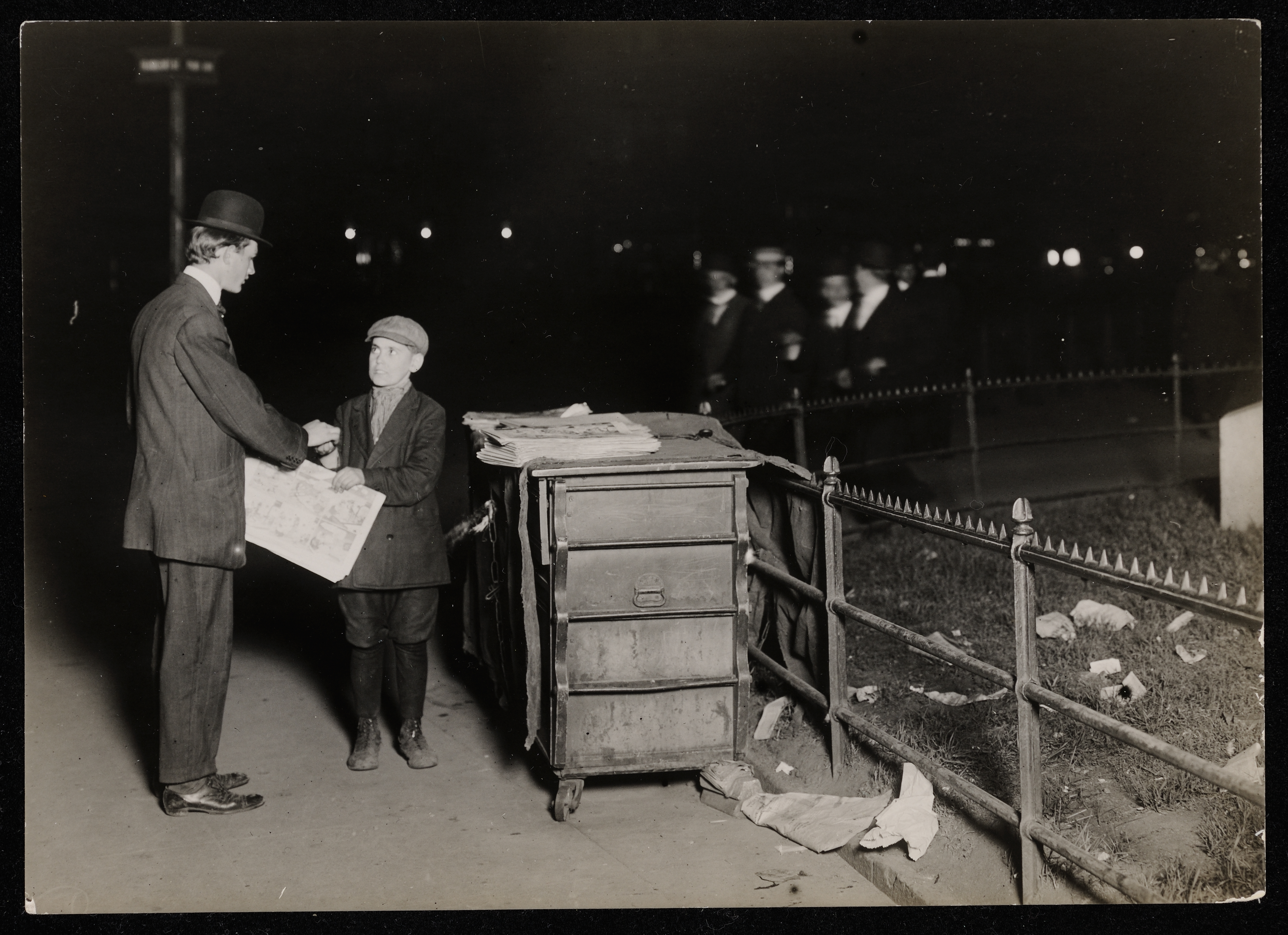
A 14-year-old newsboy in New York City, 1910

The Newsboys Strike of 1899 fought ageist employment practices targeted against the youth by large newspaper syndicates in the Northeast of America. The strikers demonstrated across the city for several days, effectively stopping circulation of the two papers, along with the news distribution for many New England cities. The strike lasted two weeks, causing Pulitzer's New York World to decrease its circulation from 360,000 papers sold per day to 125,000. Although the price of papers was not lowered, the strike was successful in forcing the World and Journal to offer full buybacks to their sellers, thus increasing the amount of money that newsies received for their work.

The American Youth Congress, or AYC, was formed in 1935 to advocate for youth rights in U.S. politics. It ended in 1940.

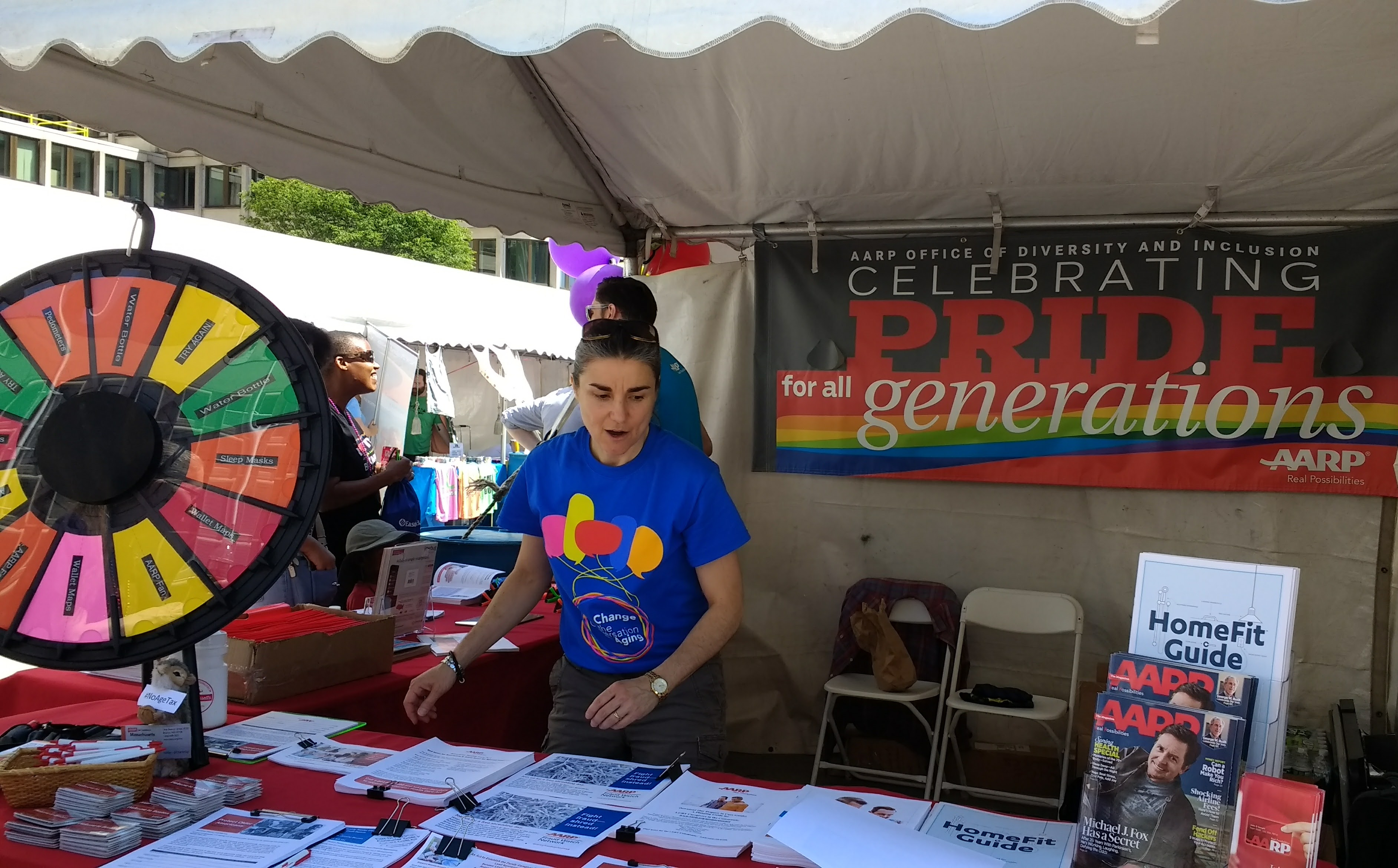
AARP booth at Boston Pride Festival, 2017

AARP was founded in 1958 by Ethel Percy Andrus (a retired educator from California) and Leonard Davis (later the founder of the Colonial Penn Group of insurance companies). Its stated mission is "to empower people to choose how they live as they age". It is an influential lobbying group in the United States focusing largely on issues affecting the elderly.

Aid for the Elderly in Government Institutions (AEGIS) was a British pressure group that campaigned to improve the care of older people in long-stay wards of National Health Service psychiatric hospitals. The group was founded by Barbara Robb in 1965, and was active until her death in 1976.

The Gray Panthers was formed in 1970 by Maggie Kuhn, with a goal of eliminating mandatory retirement in the United States; they now work on many social justice issues including eliminating ageism.

Youth Liberation of Ann Arbor was an organization based in Ann Arbor, Michigan. It existed from 1970 to 1979 and is often cited in more recent academic literature as one of the leading forerunners of several youth movements in the United States, including the youth rights movement, youth voice movement, and the youth media movement.

Three O'Clock Lobby was formed in 1976 to promote youth participation throughout traditionally ageist government structures in Michigan.

Old Lesbians Organizing for Change was founded in 1987; the mission of the organization is to "eliminate the oppression of ageism and to stand in solidarity against all oppressions" through "[the] cooperative community of Old Lesbian feminist activists from many backgrounds working for justice and the well-being of all old lesbians." Their initial meeting was inspired by the publication of the book Look Me in the Eye: Old Women, Aging and Ageism by Barbara Macdonald and Cynthia Rich in 1983.

Americans for a Society Free from Age Restrictions was formed in 1996 to "advance the civil and human rights of young people through eliminating ageist laws targeted against young people", and "to help youth counter ageism in America".

Peacefire is a U.S.-based website, with a registered address in Bellevue, Washington, dedicated to "preserving First Amendment rights for Internet users, particularly those younger than 18". It was founded in August 1996 by Bennett Haselton, who still runs it. The site's motto is, "You'll understand when you're younger."

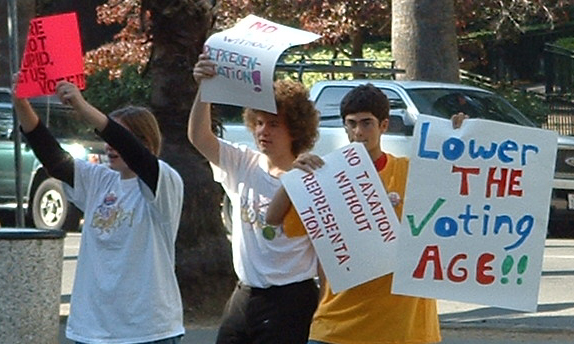
National Youth Rights Association members protesting the voting age in Berkeley, California (2004)

The National Youth Rights Association started in 1998 to promote awareness of the legal and human rights of young people in the United States.

The Freechild Project was formed in 2001 in the United States to identify, unify and promote diverse opportunities for youth engagement in social change by fighting ageism.

The Global Youth Action Network (GYAN) is an international network of youth NGOs spanning 180 countries, and headquartered in New York, near the United Nations. GYAN is a youth-led not for profit organization (registered in 2001, New York [USA], under section 501[c]3) that incubates global partnerships and increases youth participation in decision-making. GYAN has registered chapters in Brazil, Colombia, France, Ghana, Mexico, and South Africa, with teams working out of an additional eight countries.

In 2002, The Freechild Project created an information and training initiative to provide resources to youth organizations and schools focused on youth rights.

Votes at 16, founded in 2003, is a campaign in the United Kingdom which argues in favour of the reduction of the voting age to 16 for all public elections. The campaign espouses several principles in favour of lowering the voting age.

Director Paul Weitz reported he wrote the 2004 film, In Good Company, to reveal how ageism affects youth and adults.

In 2006 Lydia Giménez-Llort, an assistant professor of Psychiatry and researcher at the Autonomous University of Barcelona coined the term "Snow White Syndrome" at the "Congrés de la Gent Gran de Cerdanyola del Vallès" (Congress of the Elderly of Cerdanyola del Vallès, Barcelona, Spain) as a metaphor to define ageism in an easier and more friendly way while developing a constructive spirit against it. The metaphor is based on both the auto-ageism and adultocracy exhibited by the evil queen of the Snow White fairy tale as well as the social ageism symbolized by the mirror.

Since 2008 "The Intergenerational Study" by Lydia Giménez-Llort and Paula Ramírez-Boix from the Autonomous University of Barcelona aims to find the basis of the link between grandparents and grandsons (positive family relationships) that can minimize the ageism towards the elderly. Students at several Spanish universities enrolled in this study which soon will be also performed in the US, Nigeria, Barbados, Argentina, and Mexico. The preliminary results reveal that "The Intergenerational study questionnaire" induces young people to do a reflexive and autocritic analysis of their intergenerational relationships in contrast to those shown towards other unrelated old people which results very positive to challenge ageism. A cortometraje about "The International Study" has been directed and produced by Tomás Sunyer from Los Angeles City College.

International Youth Rights (IYR), (Chinese: 国际青年权利会, Korean: 국제청소년권리협회) is a non-profit, non-political, international organization, founded in 2009 to advance the rights of youth. Its motto is "A united force of the youth, by the youth, for the youth and beyond."

Queer activists glitter bombed Dan Savage on January 21, 2012, on the way into his "It Gets Better" show at the Vogue Theatre in Vancouver. His response was "Oh no! Not again!" The group said the bombing was in response to "ableism, ageism, classism, misogyny, racism, rape-apologism, serophobia, sizism, transphobia and, oh yeah, that column".

Chilean director Sebastian Lelio created a U.S. version of his acclaimed 2013 film Gloria. The original film challenges the notion that as women age they become culturally "invisible"; they may continue to be powerful, desirable, and sexually active. In the 2018 English remake, titled Gloria Bell, actress Julianne Moore portrayed the lead character.

Choose Responsibility and their successor organization, the Amethyst Initiative, founded by John McCardell, Jr., exist to promote the discussion of the drinking age, specifically. Choose Responsibility focuses on promoting a legal drinking age of 18, but includes provisions such as education and licensing. The Amethyst Initiative, a collaboration of college presidents and other educators, focuses on discussion and examination of the drinking age, with specific attention paid to the culture of alcohol as it exists on college campuses and the negative impact of the drinking age on alcohol education and responsible drinking.

The European Youth Portal is the starting place for the European Union's youth policy, with Erasmus+ as one of its key initiatives.

The European Youth Forum (YFJ, from Youth Forum Jeunesse) is the platform of the National Youth Council and International Non-Governmental Youth Organisations in Europe. It strives for youth rights in International Institutions such as the European Union, the Council of Europe and the United Nations. The European Youth Forum works in the fields of youth policy and youth work development. It focuses its work on European youth policy matters, whilst through engagement on the global level it is enhancing the capacities of its members and promoting global interdependence. In its daily work the European Youth Forum represents the views and opinions of youth organisations in all relevant policy areas and promotes the cross-sectoral nature of youth policy towards a variety of institutional actors. The principles of equality and sustainable development are mainstreamed in the work of the European Youth Forum. Other International youth rights organizations include Article 12 in Scotland and K.R.A.T.Z.A. in Germany.

Young India Foundation (YIF) is a youth-led youth rights organization in India, based in Gurgaon with regional chapters across India. Its aim is to make voices of youth be heard across India and seek representation for the 60% of India's demographic that is below the age of 25. YIF is also the organization behind the age of candidacy campaign to bring down the age when a Member of Legislative Assembly or Member of Parliament can contest the elections.

=== Accusations of ageism ===
In a 2005 interview, actor Pierce Brosnan cited ageism as one of the contributing factors as to why he was not asked to continue his role as James Bond in the Bond film Casino Royale, released in 2006.

Singer and actress Madonna spoke out in her 50s about ageism and her fight to defy the norms of society. In 2015, BBC Radio 1 were accused of ageism after the station did not add her new single to their playlist. Similarly, Sex and the City star Kim Cattrall has also raised the issue of ageism.

Margaret Morganroth Gullette's 2017 book, Ending Ageism or How Not to Shoot Old People, provides multiple examples to illustrate the pervasiveness of ageism and delivers a call to action.

== See also ==
- Adultism
- Age stratification
- Aging brain
- Aging in the American workforce (related: the "silver tsunami" metaphor)
- Codename: Kids Next Door
- Elder rights
- Ephebiphobia
- Generation
- Gerontocracy
- Gerontophobia
- Intergenerational equity
- International Day of Older Persons
- Lockstep compensation or Seniority-Based Compensation
- List of age-related terms with negative connotations
- List of youth organizations
- Mandatory retirement
- Memory and aging
- OK boomer
- Pedophobia
- Power harassment
- Prejudice
- Rankism
- Retirement age
- The Silver Tsunami (metaphor)
- You kids get off my lawn!
- Youth exclusion
- Youth rights
- Youth unemployment
