= IYR =

IYR may refer to:

- Idaho Youth Ranch, an American non-profit charity
- International Youth Rights, a non-profit, non-political, international organization

== See also ==
- Iyr, a type of biblical angel
