= Palmore =

Palmore is a family name. Notable people with the name include:

- Erdman B. Palmore (born 1930), American gerontologist
- John S. Palmore (1917–2017), American judge
- Roderick A. Palmore, American lawyer and businessperson
- Tara N. Palmore, American physician-scientist and epidemiologist
- Walter Palmore (born 1996), American football player

== See also ==
- Clarke–Palmore House
