= Picket fence =

Decorative fence often designating domestic property lines

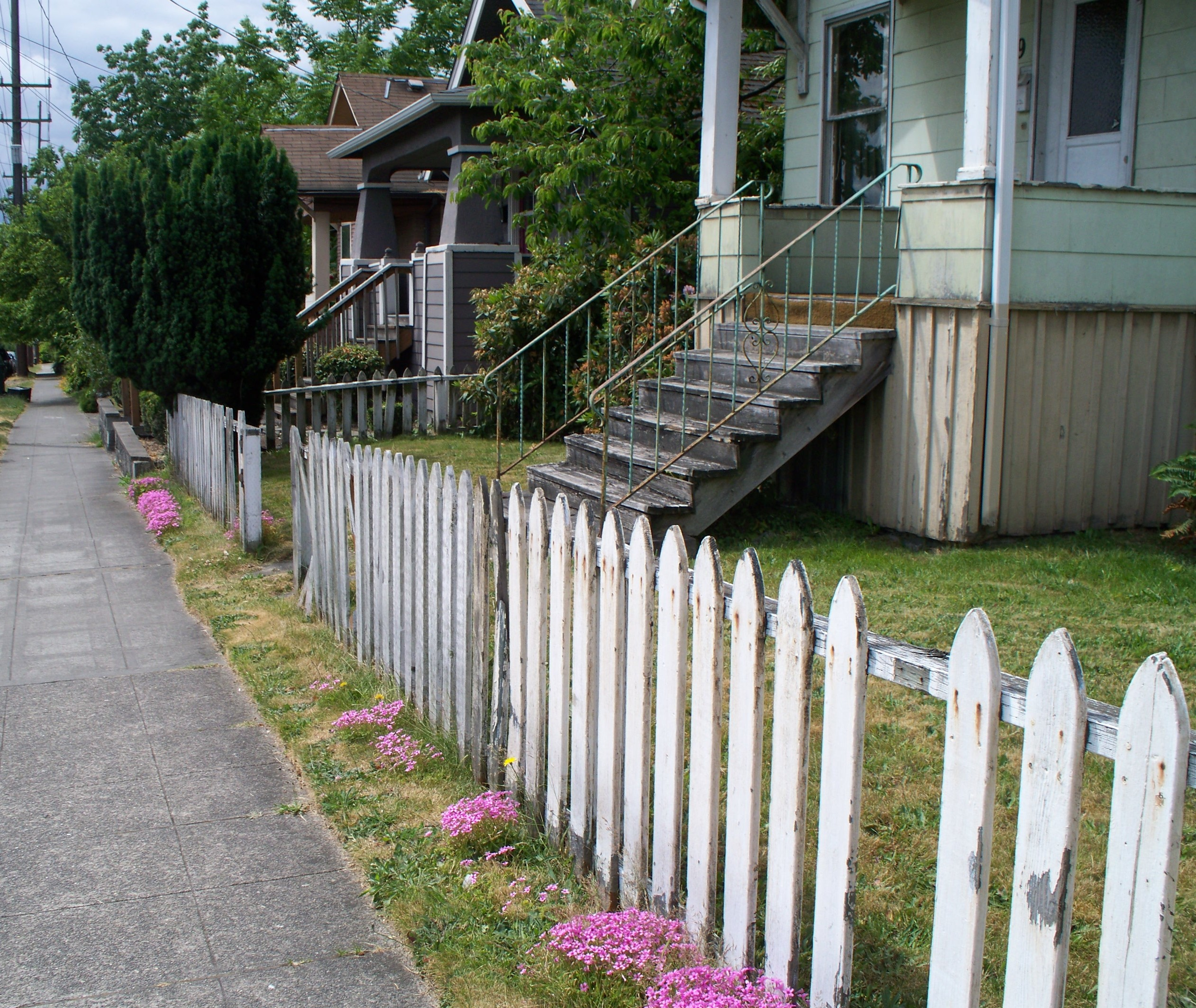
Classic white picket fence next to a sidewalk showing some signs of aging

Picket fences are a type of fence often used decoratively for domestic boundaries, distinguished by their evenly spaced vertical boards, the pickets, attached to horizontal rails. Picket fences are particularly popular in the United States, with the white picket fence coming to symbolize the ideal middle-class suburban life.

== History ==
Picket fences are particularly popular in the United States, where the style has been used since America's earliest colonial era and remains popular today. Pickets were historically sharpened logs used to defend positions and used as such by early colonists. Now they are a decorative way to contain pets and children without blocking views, and are used around both front and back yards. Traditionally picket fences were made out of wood and painted white (or whitewashed), but now picket fences are also widely available in low-maintenance polyvinyl chloride (PVC or Vinyl).

A 2026 Washington Post article reported on their decline.

Until the introduction of advertising on fences in the 1980s, cricket fields were usually surrounded by picket fences, giving rise to the expression "rattling the pickets" for a ball hit firmly into the fence.

== Design ==
A picket fence is generally 36 to 48 inches (91 to 122 cm) tall. A horizontal top rail and bottom rail are attached to fence posts, which are installed upright into the ground. Evenly spaced boards are affixed vertically to the rails. These boards with pointed tops are called "pickets" for their resemblance to the pointed stakes historically used by infantry to repel cavalry.

Picket fences can be made of several types of materials. Historically, wood has been the most popular material used for picket fences. This wood can be untreated, treated, or naturally insect and rot resistant. Available non-wood options include vinyl (PVC) and aluminum.

== Installation ==
The first step in installing a picket fence is to insert the posts into the ground. Traditionally this is done by digging deep holes (usually 36 inches (91 cm) x 12 inches (30 cm)) either manually or with a power auger. The posts are then placed upright into the ground and concrete is poured to cement them into place. Once they are set, the horizontal rails are affixed to the posts using fasteners, and finally the pickets can be attached to the horizontal rails. By far the most time-consuming part of installing a picket fence is setting the posts.

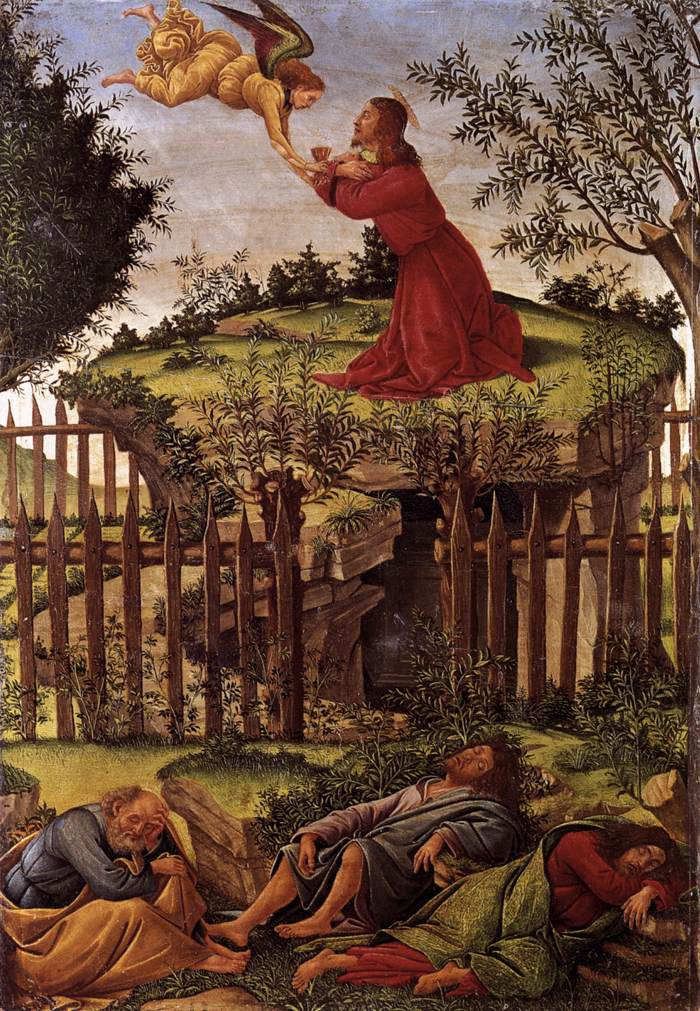
Painting with a picket fence

There are some vinyl picket fence systems on the market that are installed without digging holes or pouring concrete. These are installed by driving pipe deep into the ground, which is how chain link fence has been installed for years. This is the most popular way to install vinyl fence in Western Canada, where the deep frost can heave concrete footings out of the ground.

== Symbolism ==
The picket fence, particularly when white, has iconic status as Americana, symbolizing the ideal middle-class suburban life, with a family and children, large house, and peaceful living. This stems from the fact that houses in quiet, middle-class neighborhoods often have yards enclosed by picket fences. This symbolism is also common to works critical of the middle-class lifestyle. For example, the director David Lynch uses ironic images of the picket fence in his 1986 film Blue Velvet.

== In popular culture ==
- Botticelli shows a picket fence in his painting Agony in the Garden, painted c. 1500.
- The phrase "picket fence" also describes text without spaces between words. Such texts are very common in Old Latin, with documents often lacking both spaces and punctuation.

== Gallery ==
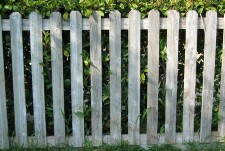
A simple picket fence

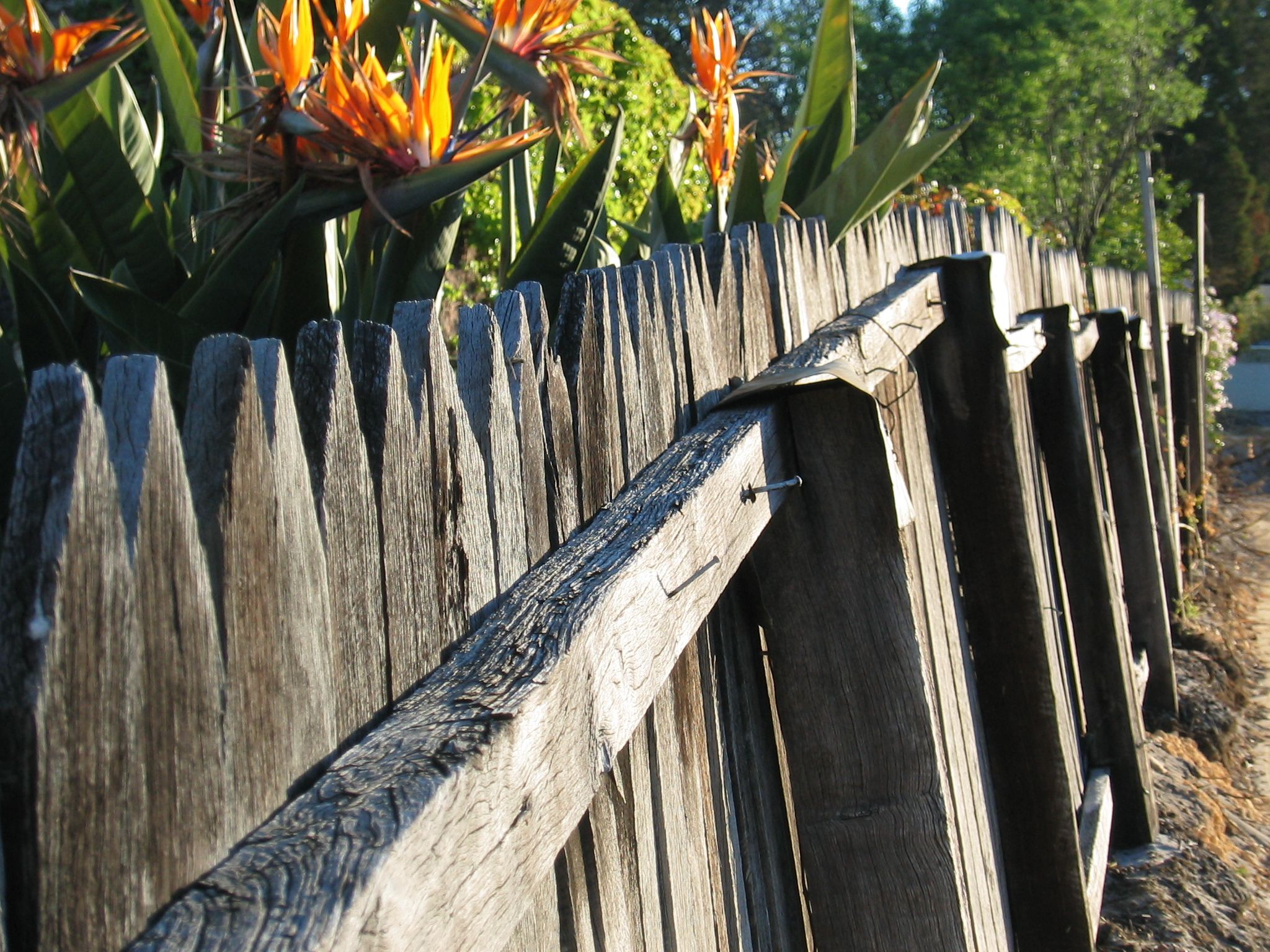
Western Australian jarrah picket fence

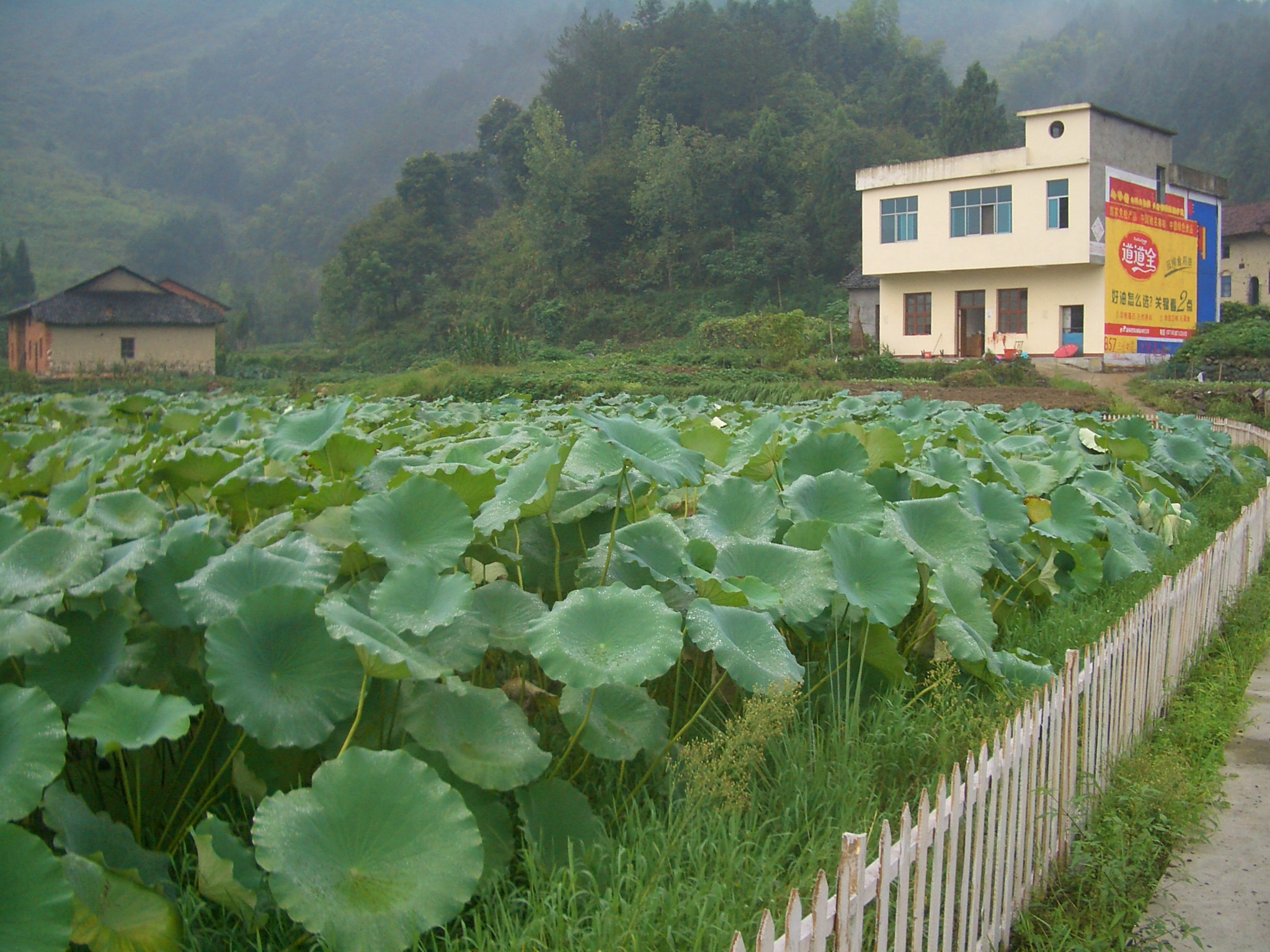
White picket fence surrounds a front-yard Lotus pond in a village in Hubei, China

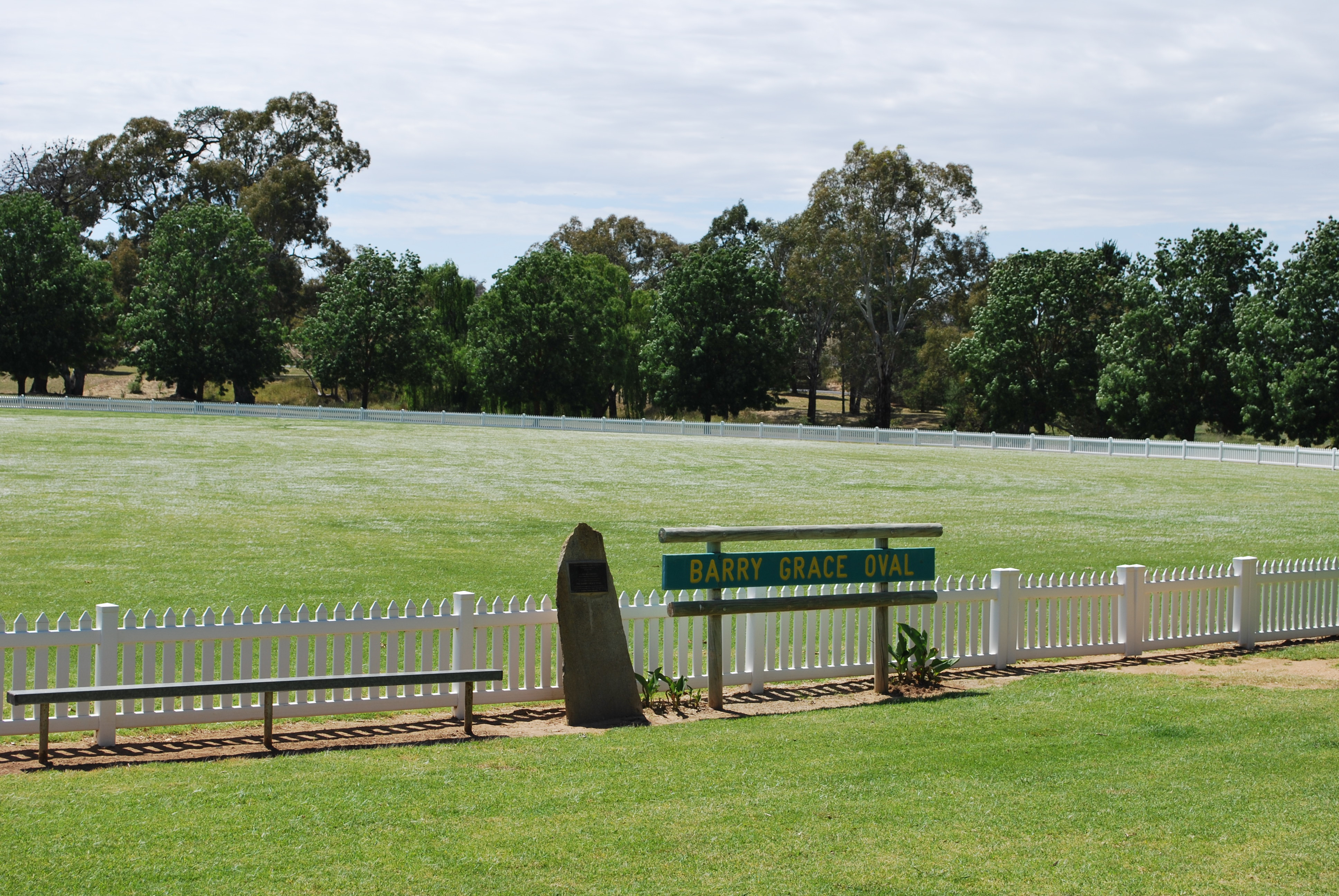
A cricket oval in Wallendbeen, New South Wales, with a white picket fence

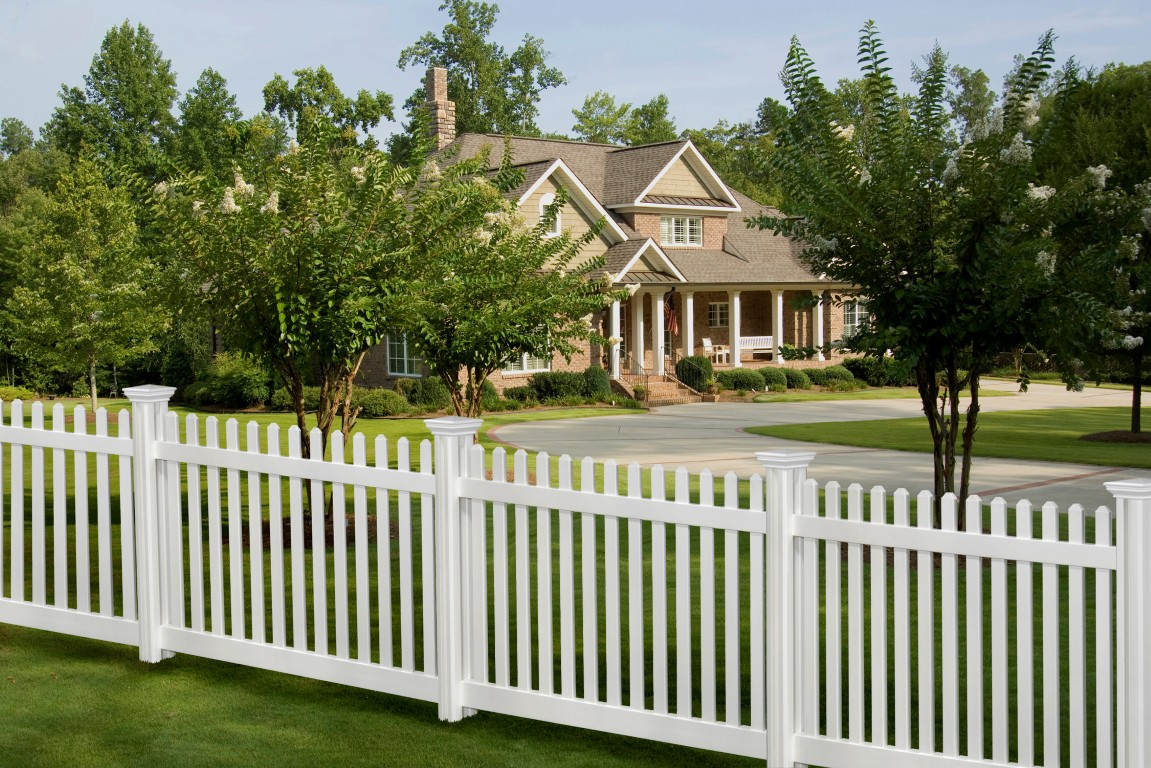
A PVC (or vinyl) Picket Fence

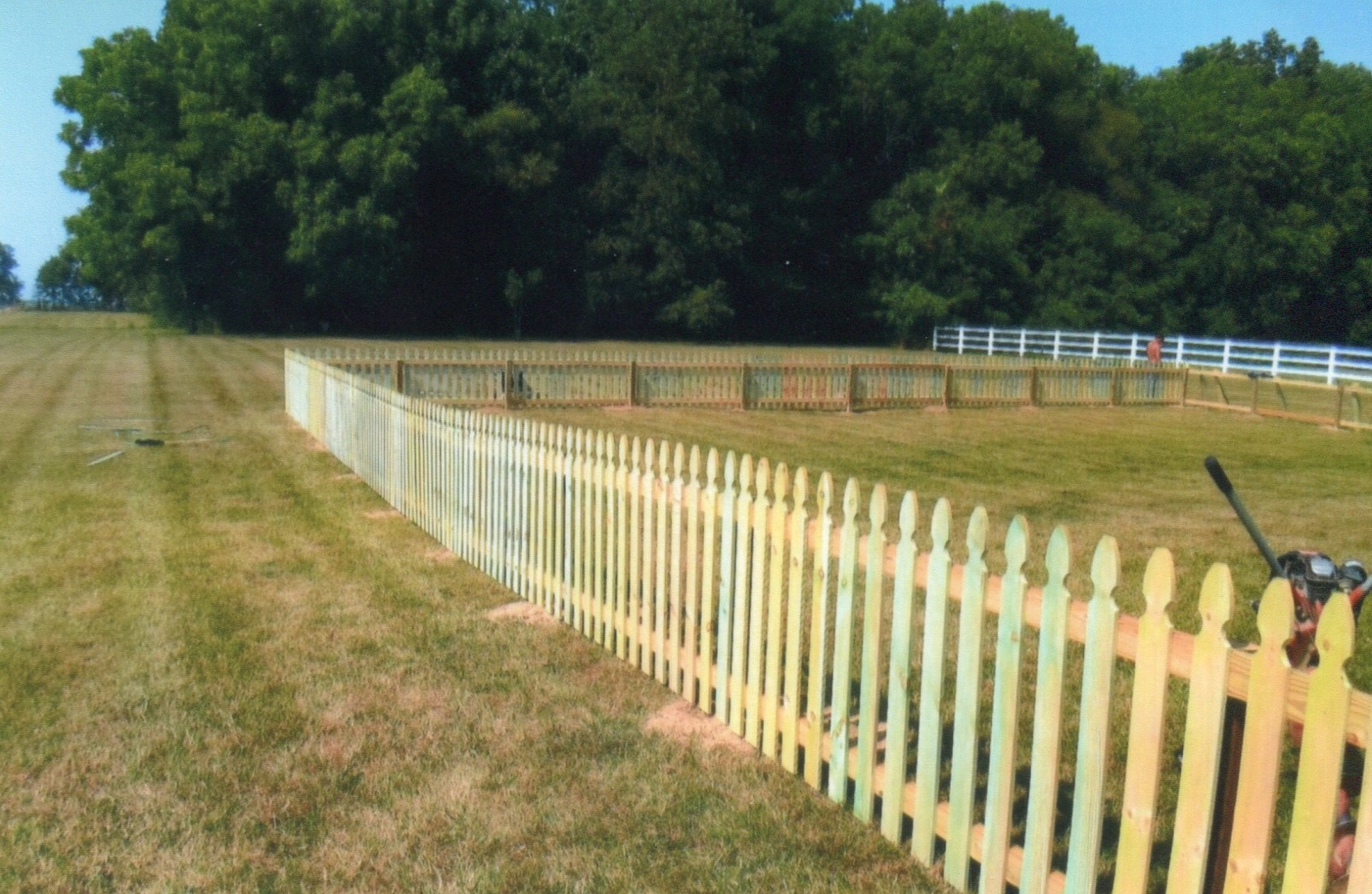
A gothic-style picket fence built using pressure treated pine

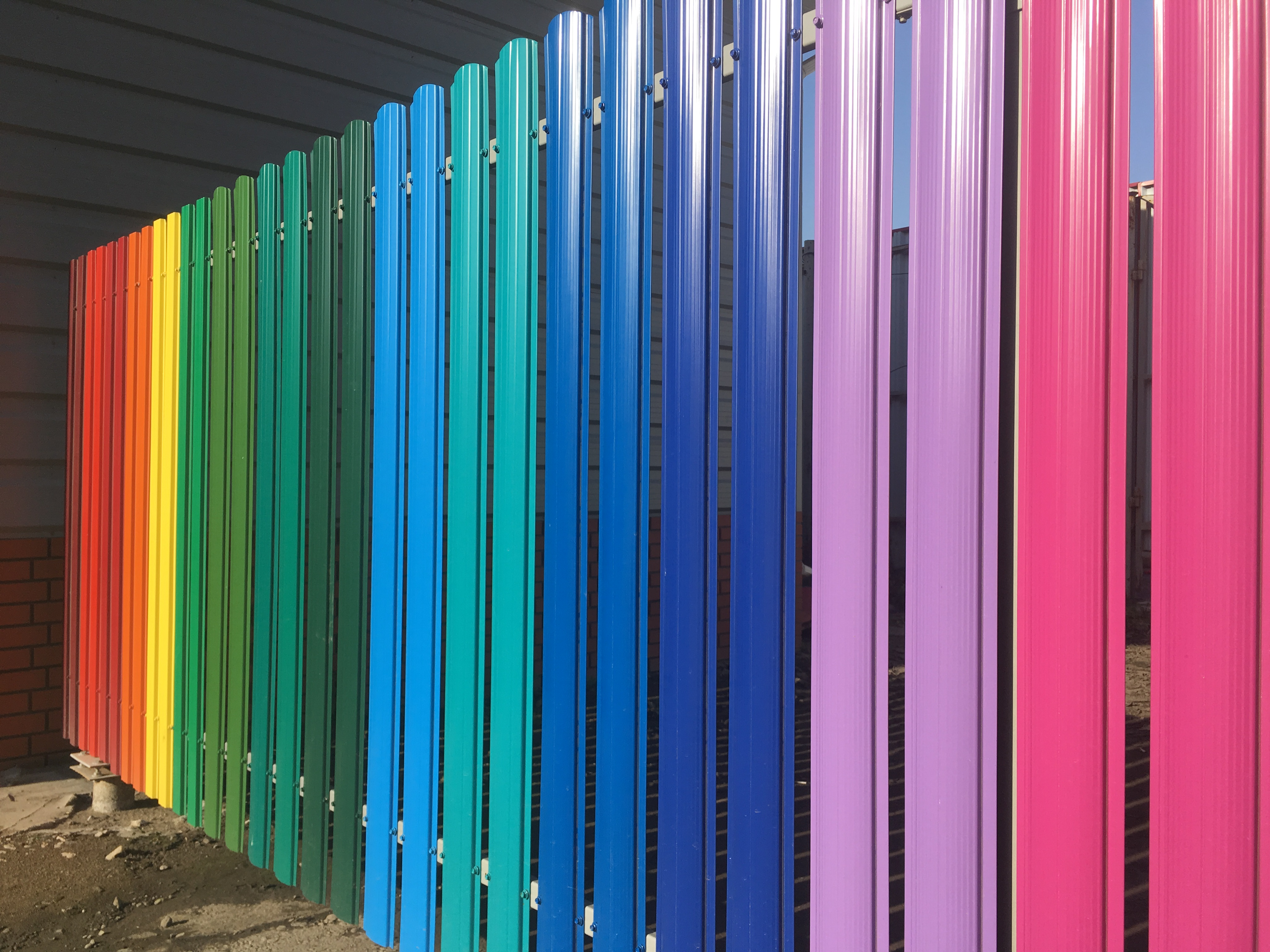
Colorful metal picket fence in Russia

== See also ==
- Temporary fencing
- Polyvinyl chloride
- Lawn
- Get off my lawn
- Quarter acre
