= Palacios de la Villa v Cortefiel Servicios SA =

- Court: European Court of Justice
- Decided: 16 October 2007
- Citations: Case C-411/05, [2007] IRLR 989

Palacios de la Villa v Cortefiel Servicios SA (C-411/05) [2007] IRLR 989 is European Union law case, concerning age discrimination law.

== Facts ==
When reaching the age of 65, Mr Palacios was notified of the automatic termination of his contract of employment on the ground that he had reached the compulsory retirement age as provided for in art.19(3) of a collective agreement and that, on July 2, 2005, a national law had been published, a single transitional provision which authorised such a measure. That single transitional provision provided that:

“clauses in collective agreements concluded prior to the entry into force of this Law, which provide for the termination of contracts of employment where workers have reached normal retirement age, shall be lawful provided it is ensured that the workers concerned have completed the minimum period of contributions and satisfy the other requirements laid down in social security legislation for entitlement to a retirement pension under their contribution regime”.

Mr Palacios fulfilled the last two conditions. He brought an action before the referring Court, requested that this notification be declared null and void on the ground that it was in breach of his fundamental rights and, more particularly, his right not to be discriminated against on the ground of age, since the measure was based solely on the fact that he had reached the age of 65.

The referring Court, inter alia, asked whether the prohibition of any discrimination based on age in employment and occupation must be interpreted as meaning that it precluded national legislation such as that in the main proceedings, pursuant to which compulsory retirement clauses contained in collective agreements were regarded as lawful, where such clauses provided as sole requirements that workers must have reached retirement age, set at 65 years by the national legislation, and must fulfil the other social security conditions for entitlement to draw a contributory retirement pension.

== Judgment ==
The European Court of Justice decided that national legislation was not prohibited under Directive 2000/78/EC.

It did fall under Article 2, because,

- Directive 2000/78 was applicable to a situation such as that giving rise to the dispute before the national court. [42-7]
- The aim of the Directive was to combat certain types of discrimination, including discrimination on grounds of age, as regards employment and occupation with a view to putting into effect in the Member States the principle of equal treatment. National legislation such as that at issue in the main proceedings must be regarded as directly imposing less favourable treatment for workers who had reached that age as compared with all other persons in the labour force. Such legislation therefore established a difference in treatment directly based on age, as referred to in Art.2(1) and (2)(a) of the Directive. [49]-[51]

But there was a justification based on Article 6(1)

- Article 6(1)(1) of the Directive provided that such inequalities would not constitute discrimination prohibited under Art.2 "if, within the context of national law, they were objectively and reasonably justified by a legitimate aim, including legitimate employment policy, labour market and vocational training objectives, and if the means of achieving that aim were appropriate and necessary". [52]
- The single transitional provision was adopted, at the instigation of the social partners, as part of a national policy seeking to promote better access to employment, by means of better distribution of work between the generations. It was true that that provision did not expressly refer to an objective of that kind. However, that fact alone was not decisive. Placed in its context, the single transitional provision was aimed at regulating the national labour market, in particular, for the purposes of checking unemployment. [53]-[62]
- The legitimacy of such an aim of public interest could not reasonably be called into question. In accordance with the first indent of Art.2(1) EU and Art.2 EC, the promotion of a high level of employment was one of the ends pursued both by the European Union and the European Community. Furthermore, encouragement of recruitment undoubtedly constituted a legitimate aim of social policy. That assessment must evidently apply to instruments of national employment policy designed to improve opportunities for entering the labour market for certain categories of workers. [63]-[65].
- Therefore, an objective such as that referred to by the legislation at issue must, in principle, be regarded as "objectively and reasonably" justifying "within the context of national law", as provided for by Art.6(1)(1) of the Directive, a difference in treatment on grounds of age laid down by the Member States. [66]

The means of pursuing these legitimate aims were furthermore held "appropriate and necessary". As Community law stood, the Member States and, where appropriate, the social partners at national level enjoyed broad discretion in their choice, not only to pursue a particular aim in the field of social and employment policy, but also in the definition of measures capable of achieving it. Such was the case as regards the choice which the national authorities concerned might be led to make on the basis of political, economic, social, demographic and/or budgetary considerations and having regard to the actual situation in the labour market in a particular Member State, to prolong people's working life or, conversely, to provide for early retirement. It was for the competent authorities of the Member States to find the right balance between the different interests involved. However, the national measures laid down in that context did not go beyond what was appropriate and necessary to achieve the aim pursued by the Member State concerned. [67]-[74]

== See also ==
- R (Incorporated Trustees of the National Council on Ageing (Age Concern England)) v Secretary of State for Business, Enterprise and Regulatory Reform [2009] IRLR 373 (C-388/07) and [2009] EWHC (Admin) 2336
- ITC Innovative Technology Center GmbH v Bundesagentur für Arbeit (C-208/05) [2008] 1 CMLR 15
- Mangold v Rudiger Helm (C-144/04) [2005] ECR I-9981, [2006] 1 CMLR 43
- Schöning-Kougebetopoulou v Freie und Hansestadt Hamburg (C-15/96) [1998] ECR I-47, [1998] 1 CMLR 931
