= Ontario (Human Rights Commission) v Etobicoke (Borough of) =

- Supreme Court of Canada

Hearing: May 13, 1981 Judgment: February 9, 1982
- Full case name: The Ontario Human Rights Commission and Bruce Dunlop and Harold E Hall and Vincent Gray v The Borough of Etobicoke
- Citations: [1982] 1 S.C.R. 202
- Ruling: OHRC appeal allowed

Court membership
- Chief Justice: Bora Laskin; Puisne Justices: Ronald Martland, Roland Ritchie, Brian Dickson, Jean Beetz, Willard Estey, William McIntyre, Julien Chouinard, Antonio Lamer

Reasons given
- Unanimous reasons by: McIntyre J.

Ontario (Human Rights Commission) v Etobicoke (Borough of), [1982] 1 S.C.R. 202 is a leading Supreme Court of Canada decision on age discrimination. Several firemen challenged a mandatory retirement policy under the Ontario Human Rights Code. The Court found that the employer did not sufficiently justify the policy as a bona fide occupational requirement.

== Background ==
Harold Hall and Vincent Gray were firemen in the borough of Etobicoke, Ontario. As part of the collective agreement between the borough and the union, all firefighters were required to retire at the age of 60. When Hall and Grey were forced to retire they brought a complaint for age discrimination under section 4(1) of the Ontario Human Rights Code which prohibited discrimination in recruitment or dismissal based on age among other grounds.

The respondents defended their actions by arguing that the rule was a bona fide occupational requirement (BFOR). Namely, that the rule was required to maintain an acceptable standard for firefighting.

In the Ontario Divisional Court, it was held that the policy was a BFOR and so did not violate section 4(1) of the Code.

== Reasons of the court ==
Justice McIntyre, writing for the unanimous Court, overturned the lower court decision and found that the policy was not justified. He noted that an employee or union cannot waive their rights under the Code through collective agreements. The standard to meet to establish a BFOR must be an objective one that is supported by concrete evidence. McIntyre found that the evidence presented was weak and did not sufficiently justify the requirement.

== See also ==
- List of Supreme Court of Canada cases
