= Silver tsunami =

Late-20th-century demographic phenomenon of population aging

Silver tsunami (also known as grey tsunami, gray tsunami, silver wave, gray wave, or grey wave) is a metaphor used to describe population aging; specifically, baby boomers reaching the age of 65 starting in 2011. This demographic shift will result in a massive expansion to the number of people living in first world nations over the age of 80. The term silver tsunami metaphor has been employed in both popular media and in scholarly literature to refer to the late-twentieth-century demographic shift towards population aging. This phenomenon has been documented in prominent media outlets, such as The Economist, Forbes.com, and multiple news outlets. It has also been used to refer more specifically to the health and economic implications associated with population aging by major medical publications, including The British Medical Journal, New England Journal of Medicine, and professional organizations including American Psychological Association.

According to Google's Ngram Viewer, variants of the silver tsunami metaphor (for example: age wave, grey hoard, rising tide, grey or gray tsunami) first occurred in reference to population aging in the 1980s.

== Controversy ==
Scholars from a range of disciplines including humanities, health professions, and social science have argued that the silver tsunami does not constitute neutral language to describe population aging, calling it "dangerous" and "a nasty metaphor for older adults".

Critics of the silver tsunami phrase (and its variants) have argued that it represents an important example of ageist language. For example, Andrea Charise (2012) writes that the prevalent use of this metaphor in popular and professional media "testifies to the barely conscious figurative language that serves to construct perceptions of an aging population."

"The Winter 2010 President's Message from the Canadian Institutes of Health Research begins by invoking "the 'grey tsunami'—the tide of chronic diseases arising from an aging population which threatens to swamp our health-care system, economy, and quality of life." Similarly, in 2010 the Alzheimer Society of Canada published a major commissioned report on the projected impact of dementia entitled "Rising Tide." This ominous rhetoric of rising, swamping, tides, and disease—amplified by the authoritative tones of medical and health policy expertise—conceives of population aging as an imminent catastrophe" (Charise, p.3).

In a 2013 editorial in the Journal of Gerontological Social Work entitled "The Aging Tsunami: Time for a New Metaphor?", Amanda Barusch builds on this objection, by describing the "inaccurate, damaging perceptions" of older age. "The specter of millions of dependent elders sweeping over the land makes us shiver. And this is what fuels the aging tsunami metaphor".

In a content analysis (2009) of The Economist's digital archive between 1997 and 2008, Ruth Martin, Caroline Williams, and Desmond O'Neill conclude that "There is a noticeable trend to ageism in one of the most influential economic and political magazines in the world." In place of the silver tsunami's "apocalyptic" imagery, critics have suggested abandoning the metaphor in favour of different, and ideally more neutral, terminology with less overtly ageist connotations. "Geriatricians and gerontologists who want to influence policymakers to improve services for older people will need to engage in a dialogue with journalists in areas other than the biomedical literature."

== See also ==
- Pensions crisis
