= Idaho Youth Ranch =

American non-profit charity

The Idaho Youth Ranch (IYR) is an American non-profit charity operating in Idaho. It was founded in 1953 by James and Ruby Carey Crowe.

Idaho Youth Ranch programs include counseling & therapy services for youth and families, Hays House, a youth crisis shelter, YOUTHWORKS!, a job readiness program, and adoptions. Idaho Youth Ranch is operates equine therapy at its Hands of Promise Campus in Caldwell and in North Idaho at Mica Meadows. IYR also owns and operates thrift stores throughout Idaho that serve as a source of funding for their youth programs Idaho Youth Ranch is governed by a volunteer board of directors.
