= You kids get off my lawn! =

Stereotypical American expression

"You kids get off my lawn!" is an American expression of the late 20th century and early 21st century. Slight variations including "Get off my lawn!", "Get off my damn lawn!", and "You kids get out of my yard!" are common. This phrase presents the supposed reaction of a stereotypical elderly homeowner confronting obstreperous children or adolescents entering or crossing their property. Today, the phrase has been expanded to mock any sort of complaint, particularly those of older people regarding the young.

== Background ==
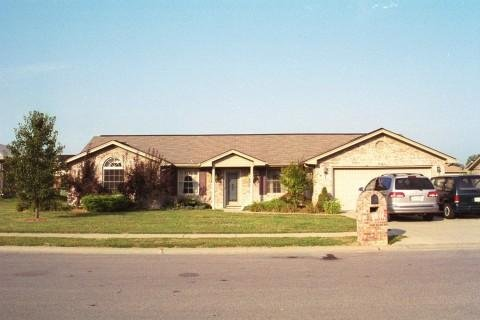
Suburban house with lawn

Until the late 19th century, private lawns in the modern sense were mainly associated with wealthy estates. The introduction of affordable mechanical manual lawnmowers made it possible for small lawns to be maintained by individuals.

During the post–World War II economic expansion, many persons from rural and urban backgrounds moved to single-family detached homes with lawns in the suburbs or in horizontally developed cities. Pride in new-found affluence was expressed in attention to these lawns, and the characteristic American high valuation of private property rights was expressed in an especially proprietary attitude toward this real property.

In the 1950s, '60s, and '70s, some of these first-generation homeowners were approaching or reaching retirement age, while the suburban-raised baby boomers were accustomed to the affluence symbolized by lawns as unremarkable.

This led to instances of the archetypical encounter envisioned by the idiom, of an older homeowner's reprimand of careless or disrespectful minors heedlessly shortcutting across his highly valued lawn. Individual instances of these mundane encounters seldom enter the historical record, although some incidents have escalated to notable levels.

== Popularization ==
The idiom was popularized by American baby-boomer television host David Letterman as one of his comedic taglines, beginning in the 1980s. Since then, it has gained general currency.

Stephanie Miller occasionally ascribed the phrase "Hey! You kids get off my lawn!" to Senator John McCain in her satirical portraits of McCain. (McCain, in a 2008 appearance on David Letterman's Late Show gamely uttered the idiom himself in a comedy turn.) The Capitol Steps album I'm So Indicted included "Hey, You, Get Off of My Lawn" (a parody of "Get Off of My Cloud"), and comic social commentator Jon Stewart described United States Defense Secretary Donald Rumsfeld as "a cantankerous old man who takes a hey-you-kids-get-off-my-lawn approach to foreign policy".

Rock musician John Doe used the idiom to describe the kind of person that he and other aging hipsters wished to avoid becoming, and the Fensler Films short film Skier featured Snow Job berating the protagonists with an obscene version ("Hey, what the fuck are you kids doing on my fucking lawn?"). Bryan Cox's Public Radio Exchange radio program is titled Hey, Get Off My Lawn In 2011, The Wall Street Journal summarized John Paulson's response to Occupy Wall Street with the title "Billionaire Tells Occupy Wall Street to Get Off His Lawn".

In the opening scene of the 2006 animated film Monster House, Horace Nebbercracker (voiced by Steve Buscemi) screams "Get off my lawn!" at a little girl, before grabbing and destroying her tricycle.

In an early scene of the 2008 movie Gran Torino, a rifle-toting Walt Kowalski (played by Clint Eastwood) growls "Get off my lawn" several times to neighborhood punks, leading film critic Kenneth Turan to note: "Even at 78, Eastwood can make 'Get off my lawn' sound as menacing as 'Make my day'".

The office softball team for senior citizen advocacy organization AARP in Washington, DC's Congressional Softball League is named, "Get Off Our Lawn".

== In Britain ==
In Britain, a similar phrase has a different source and meaning. In 1993, John Major in a speech warned "Get your tractors off our lawn" (in reference to French trade demands), and in 1996, politician Kenneth Clarke allegedly told Brian Mawhinney "Tell your kids to get their scooters off my lawn" (Clarke was speaking of Eurosceptics in his own party).

But these referred to a well-known 1969 incident in which Prime Minister Harold Wilson told trade-union leader Hugh Scanlon to "Get your tanks off my lawn". (Wilson was speaking metaphorically and referencing the previous year's Soviet Union crushing of the Prague Spring.) The phrase "to park tanks on the lawn" still means, in Britain, bringing to bear unwarranted pressure; for instance, a 2009 Guardian article was titled "Why Google is parking its tanks on Microsoft's lawn".

== See also ==
- Ageism
- "The Old Man and the Key", an episode of The Simpsons that inspired the meme "Old Man Yells at Cloud"
