= Erdman B. Palmore =

American gerontologist (born 1930)

- Born: June 3, 1930 (age 96); Tokuyama, Japan
- Citizenship: United States
- Education: Columbia University
- Awards: Distinguished Academic Gerontologist from the Southern Gerontological Society in 1989
- Scientific career
- Fields: Gerontology, Sociology

Erdman Ballagh Palmore (born June 3, 1930) is an American gerontologist. He is Professor Emeritus of Medical Sociology at Duke University and has written several books, including Facts on Aging Quiz, and numerous articles on aging.

== Biography ==
Palmore was born June 3, 1930, in Tokuyama, Yamaguchi, Japan to missionary parents. An American citizen, he was raised in Virginia. Palmore served in the United States Army from 1954 to 1956 and is married with two children. He graduated from Duke University in Durham, North Carolina in 1952; received a Master of Arts from the University of Chicago in Illinois in 1954 and a Ph.D. from Columbia University in New York City in 1959, all in Sociology. He taught at Finch College in New York City and Yale University in New Haven, Connecticut from 1960 to 1963.

The roots of Palmore's research on ageism began when he was a student at the University of Chicago in the 1950s and was conducting research on racism. Noting the similarity between stereotypes of African Americans and older people, he began research on ageist stereotyping. As a professor, he developed the Facts on Aging Quiz in order to gain the attention of students on the first day of class. In 1990, he published a textbook summarizing the theories and research about ageism. Palmore has become a role model for successful aging by challenging ageist stereotypes. One way he has achieved this success is by becoming physically stronger through activities such as weightlifting; he rides his age in miles once a year on his bicycle, and chooses a different adventure to participate in every year on his birthday.

== Career highlights and accomplishments ==
At Duke University, Palmore has been coordinator for the Duke Longitudinal Studies and Principal Investigator of several research projects.

He is a Fellow of both the American Sociological Society and the Gerontological Society of America, and has served as President of the Southern Gerontological Society. His research and teaching interests include race relations, retirement, longevity, life satisfaction, health, and international gerontology. Currently he is a professor emeritus of Medical Sociology at the Duke University Center for the Study of Aging and Human Development.

== Awards, honors, and distinctions ==
Palmore was the recipient of the Outstanding Academic Book of the Year award for the International Handbook on Aging by Choice Magazine in 1980–81.

He received the award for Distinguished Academic Gerontologist from the Southern Gerontological Society in 1989 and the Third Age Award from the International Congress of Gerontology for his outstanding paper, "Predictors of Outcome in Nursing Homes". I

== Publications ==
Palmore is arguably best known for his Facts on Aging Quiz published in 1976 that has been used extensively by researchers to test an individual's general knowledge of aging. The book was updated in 1998 and is still being used to help people become aware of their prejudices about older people. In 1988 Palmore published The facts on Aging Quiz: A Handbook of Uses and Results based on over 90 studies using his quiz. Palmore is the second most cited author in The Encyclopedia of Aging, reflecting his numerous publications in gerontology.

=== Selected publications ===
- Palmore E (1970). Normal Aging I. Durham NC: Duke University Press.
- Palmore E & Luikart C (1972) "Health and Social Factors Related to Life Satisfaction". Journal of Health and Social Behavior 13:68-80.
- Palmore E (1974). Normal Aging II. Durham NC: Duke University Press.
- Palmore E (1980). "International Handbook on Aging" Westprot CT: Greenwood Press.
- Palmore E (1982). "Preparation for Retirement" Osgood, N (ed.), "Life After Work" NY: Praeger Publications.
- Palmore E (1984). Handbook on the Aged in the U.S. Westport, CT: Greenwood Press.
- Palmore E (1985). Normal Aging III. Durham NC: Duke University Press.
- Palmore E (1990). "Predictors of Outcome in Nursing Homes". Journal of Applied Gerontology, 9: 172–184.
- Palmore E (2005). Three Decades of Research on Ageism. Generations, 29(3), 87–90.
- Palmore E (2009). Reducing Ageism. Journal of Aging, Humanities and the Arts, 3(2), 144–146.
- Palmore E (2011). Older Can Be Bolder. New York, NY: CreateSpace and Kindle.

== See also ==
- Gerontology
- Ageism
- Aging
