= Tara N. Palmore =

American physician-scientist and epidemiologist

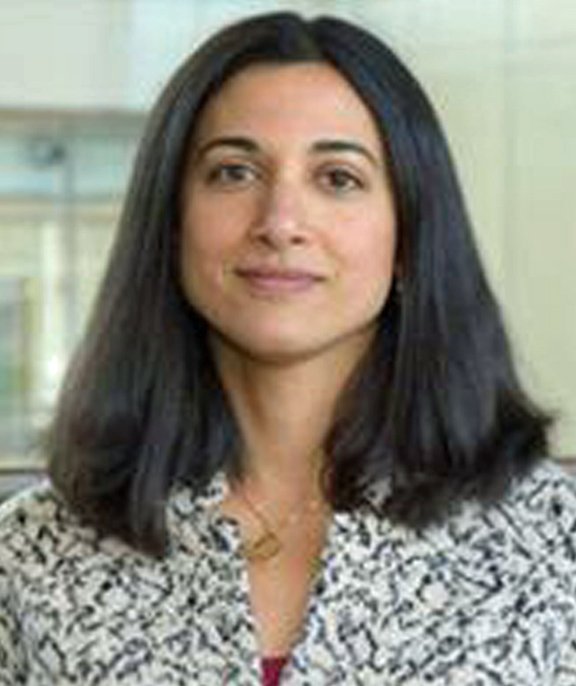
- Palmore in 2018
- Education: Harvard College; University of Virginia School of Medicine
- Scientific career
- Fields: Hospital epidemiology
- Workplaces: National Institute of Allergy and Infectious Diseases; National Institutes of Health Clinical Center

Tara N. Palmore is an American physician-scientist and epidemiologist specializing in patient safety through prevention of hospital-acquired infections. As of 2023 she was a Senior Medical Advisor at the National Institute of Allergy and Infectious Diseases (NIAID) at the National Institutes of Health (NIH).

== Education ==
Palmore earned an undergraduate degree from Harvard College and a M.D. from the University of Virginia School of Medicine. She completed her internship and residency in internal medicine at the NewYork-Presbyterian Hospital/Cornell Internal Medicine Residency Program and her fellowship in infectious diseases at the NIH's NIAID fellowship program.

== Career ==
In 2005, Palmore began her career at the NIH as a staff clinician in the NIAID laboratory of clinical infectious diseases. She became deputy hospital epidemiologist in the NIH Clinical Center in 2007, focused on optimizing patient safety through prevention of hospital-acquired infections. In 2013, along with Dr. Julie Segre and other NIH colleagues, Palmore was awarded a Samuel J. Heyman Award for Federal Employee of the Year for her work stopping a deadly epidemic of a multi-drug resistant strain of Klebsiella pneumoniae through genomic sequencing. She was promoted to hospital epidemiologist in 2014. In 2021, she became a Professor of Medicine in the Division of Infectious Diseases and Hospital Epidemiologist at George Washington University School of Medicine and Health Sciences In 2023, she returned to the NIAID to become a Senior Medical Advisor.

== Selected works ==
- Tscharke, David C.; Karupiah, Gunasegaran; Zhou, Jie; Palmore, Tara; Irvine, Kari R.; Haeryfar, S.M. Mansour; Williams, Shanicka; Sidney, John; Sette, Alessandro; Bennink, Jack R.; Yewdell, Jonathan W. (January 2005). "Identification of poxvirus CD8+ T cell determinants to enable rational design and characterization of smallpox vaccines". Journal of Experimental Medicine. 201 (1): 95–104. doi:10.1084/jem.20041912. ISSN 1540-9538. PMC 2212779. PMID 15623576.
- Henderson, David K.; Dembry, Louise; Fishman, Neil O.; Grady, Christine; Lundstrom, Tammy; Palmore, Tara N.; Sepkowitz, Kent A.; Weber, David J.; Society for Healthcare Epidemiology of America (March 2010). "SHEA Guideline for Management of Healthcare Workers Who Are Infected with Hepatitis B Virus, Hepatitis C Virus, and/or Human Immunodeficiency Virus". Infection Control & Hospital Epidemiology. 31 (3): 203–232. doi:10.1086/650298. ISSN 0899-823X. PMID 20088696. S2CID 246632.
- Snitkin, E. S.; Zelazny, A. M.; Thomas, P. J.; Stock, F.; NISC Comparative Sequencing Program; Henderson, D. K.; Palmore, T. N.; Segre, J. A. (August 2012). "Tracking a Hospital Outbreak of Carbapenem-Resistant Klebsiella pneumoniae with Whole-Genome Sequencing". Science Translational Medicine. 4 (148): 148ra116. doi:10.1126/scitranslmed.3004129. ISSN 1946-6234. PMC 3521604. PMID 22914622.
- Marston, Hilary D.; Dixon, Dennis M.; Knisely, Jane M.; Palmore, Tara N.; Fauci, Anthony S. (September 2016). "Antimicrobial Resistance". JAMA. 316 (11): 383–394. doi:10.1001/jama.2016.11764. ISSN 0098-7484. PMC 2536104. PMID 6603914.
