= Mangold v Helm =

European Court of Justice case about age discrimination in employment

- Court: European Court of Justice
- Citation: (2005) C-144/04

Keywords
- Equality, age discrimination

Mangold v Helm (2005) C-144/04 was a case before the European Court of Justice (ECJ) about age discrimination in employment.

== Facts ==
Mangold was a 56-year-old German man employed on a fixed term contract in a permanent full-time job. The German government introduced the so-called Employment Promotion Act 1996 (German: Beschäftigungsförderungsgesetz) which allowed fixed term contracts for a two-year maximum, and otherwise were unlawful unless they could be objectively justified. This protection was removed if the employee was over 60, and further amendments then changed the age to 52. Mangold claimed that the lack of protection, over age 52, was unjustified age discrimination.

== Judgment ==
The ECJ held in its judgment the German law contravened the Employment Equality Framework Directive, even though it did not have to be implemented until the end of 2006. It said that, in general terms, legislation that lets employers treat people differently because of their age “offends the principle” in international law of eliminating discrimination on the basis of age. The ECJ ruled that national courts must set aside any provision of national law which conflicts with the directive even before the period for implementation has expired.

64. ... application of national legislation such as that at issue in the main proceedings leads to a situation in which all workers who have reached the age of 52, without distinction, whether or not they were unemployed before the contract was concluded and whatever the duration of any period of unemployment, may lawfully, until the age at which they may claim their entitlement to a retirement pension, be offered fixed-term contracts of employment which may be renewed an indefinite number of times. This significant body of workers, determined solely on the basis of age, is thus in danger, during a substantial part of its members’ working life, of being excluded from the benefit of stable employment which, however, as the Framework Agreement makes clear, constitutes a major element in the protection of workers.

65. In so far as such legislation takes the age of the worker concerned as the only criterion for the application of a fixed-term contract of employment, when it has not been shown that fixing an age threshold, as such, regardless of any other consideration linked to the structure of the labour market in question or the personal situation of the person concerned, is objectively necessary to the attainment of the objective which is the vocational integration of unemployed older workers, it must be considered to go beyond what is appropriate and necessary in order to attain the objective pursued. Observance of the principle of proportionality requires every derogation from an individual right to reconcile, so far as is possible, the requirements of the principle of equal treatment with those of the aim pursued (see, to that effect, Case C-476/99 Lommers [2002] ECR I‑2891, paragraph 39). Such national legislation cannot, therefore, be justified under Article 6(1) of Directive 2000/78.

[...]

75. The principle of non-discrimination on grounds of age must thus be regarded as a general principle of Community law. Where national rules fall within the scope of Community law, which is the case with Paragraph 14(3) of the TzBfG, as amended by the Law of 2002, as being a measure implementing Directive 1999/70 (see also, in this respect, paragraphs 51 and 64 above), and reference is made to the Court for a preliminary ruling, the Court must provide all the criteria of interpretation needed by the national court to determine whether those rules are compatible with such a principle (Case C-442/00 Rodríguez Caballero [2002] ECR I-11915, paragraphs 30 to 32).

76. Consequently, observance of the general principle of equal treatment, in particular in respect of age, cannot as such be conditional upon the expiry of the period allowed the Member States for the transposition of a directive intended to lay down a general framework for combating discrimination on the grounds of age, in particular so far as the organisation of appropriate legal remedies, the burden of proof, protection against victimisation, social dialogue, affirmative action and other specific measures to implement such a directive are concerned.

== Significance ==
Because it recognised that equal treatment is a general principle of EU law, Mangold v Helm is significant for three critical reasons. First, it means that a claim for equal treatment is available for private citizens on a horizontal situation. It is not necessary to wait for a Directive to be implemented before making a claim to have caused discrimination. Second, it means that member state and EU legislation, like Directives, may be challenged on the ground that they fail to comply with the general principle of equal treatment. Third, because the court did not limit its remarks to the particular grounds of discrimination presently found in the equal treatment Directives (on sex, race, and disability, belief, sexual orientation and age) it follows that claims against discrimination on the basis of other characteristics may be possible (such as caste, education, property or military service). It would be likely to reflect the jurisprudence from the European Convention on Human Rights, where Article 14 which lists similar grounds to those already in the EU Directives but also adds "or other status".

== See also ==
- UK labour law
- EU labour law
