= International Youth Rights =

- Formation: 2009 (founded)

International Youth Rights (IYR), (Chinese: 国际青年权利会, Korean: 국제청소년권리협회) is a non-profit, non-political, international organization, founded in 2009 to advance the rights of youth. Its motto is "A united force of the youth, by the youth, for the youth and beyond." To date, IYR is one of the only youth rights organizations to have a presence in China.

== History ==
IYR was founded in December 2009 by Seung Woo Son of the Suzhou Singapore International School. The first inaugural conference was held June 2010 at Soochow University in China.

In 2010, International members were recruited through UNICEF's Voices of Youth blog to represent their country and collaborate as an International NPO. The organization aims to centre all activities around an annual theme. Annual themes have included Corporal punishment in the home and in school settings, Universal Primary Education, and children's health care.

The organizations currently has members in 21 countries, including: Egypt, Nigeria, Cameroon, Uganda, Rwanda, The Gambia, Kenya, Madagascar, South Africa, Ghana, United States, Mexico, China, Japan, Vietnam, India, Pakistan, Yemen, Belgium, Germany, and Albania. IYR is a member of the Child Rights International Network.

== Work ==
The main objectives of International Youth Rights are to unite international and local youth bodies globally, make voices of youth be heard across the world, influence decision-making of the leaders of the world, secure global attention on youths and children, and empower youth and children to become decision-makers of today and tomorrow.

In 2011, IYR compiled the International Youth Report which was submitted to the United Nations Children's Fund and the Global Initiative to End All Corporal Punishment of Children. On 27 May 2011, the organization won the Service Award from the Association of China and Mongolia International Schools.

In China, IYR has a program that pays for all or part of the medical costs of surgeries for children with congenital heart defects.
