= SS Karnak =

SS Karnak is the name of the following ships:

- SS Karnak (1855), part of the Cunard Line, wrecked at the western end of Paradise Island near Nassau, Bahamas on 14 April 1862
- SS Karnak (1872), launched 22 July 1872, severely damaged in a collision in December 1876
- SS Karnak (1898), sunk by SM U-32 on 27 November 1916
- SS Karnak, a fictional ship in Death on the Nile, a novel by Agatha Christie, and its film adaptation

== See also ==
- Karnak (disambiguation)
