= Silver (color) =

Metallic color tone resembling gray

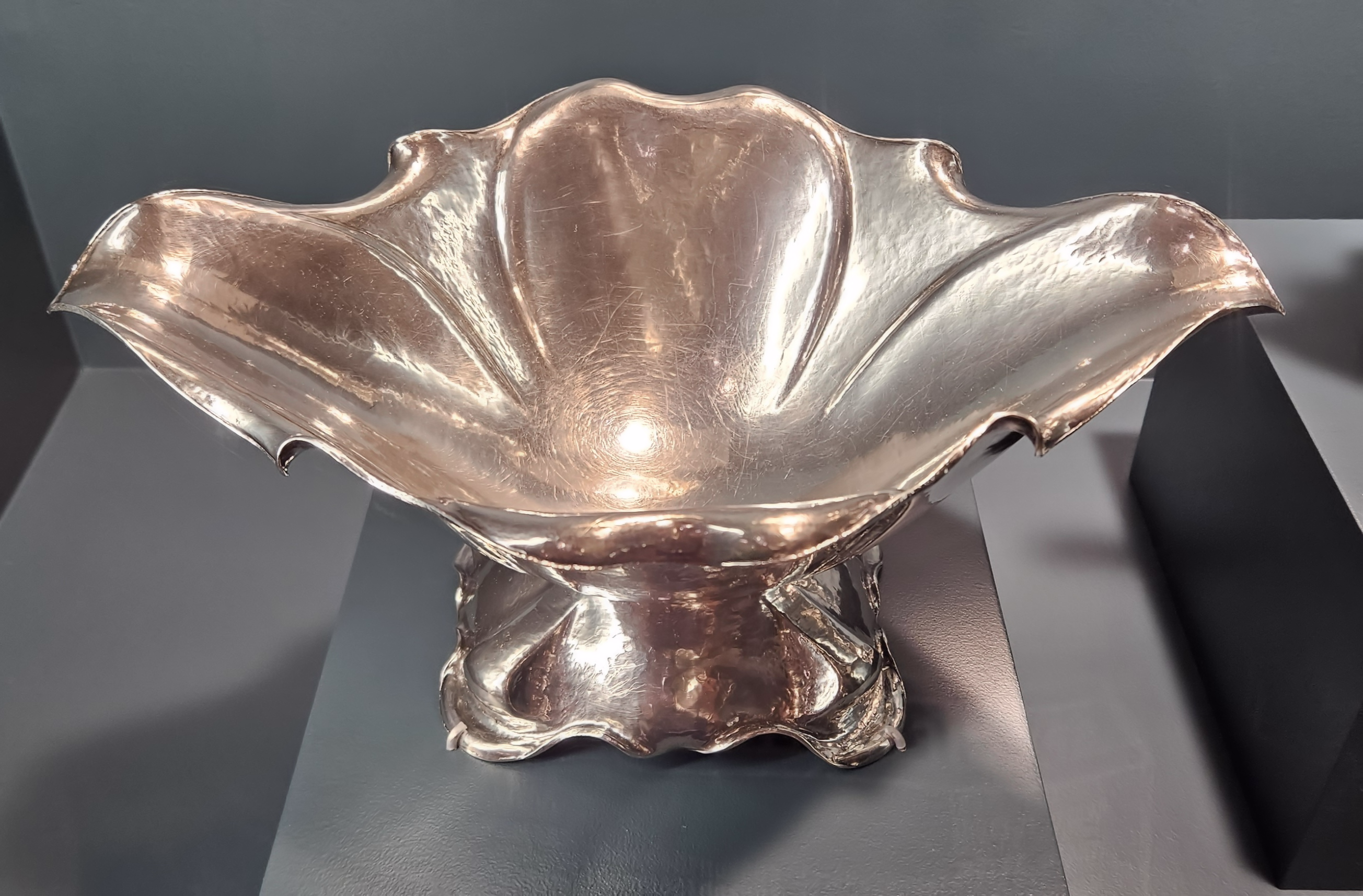
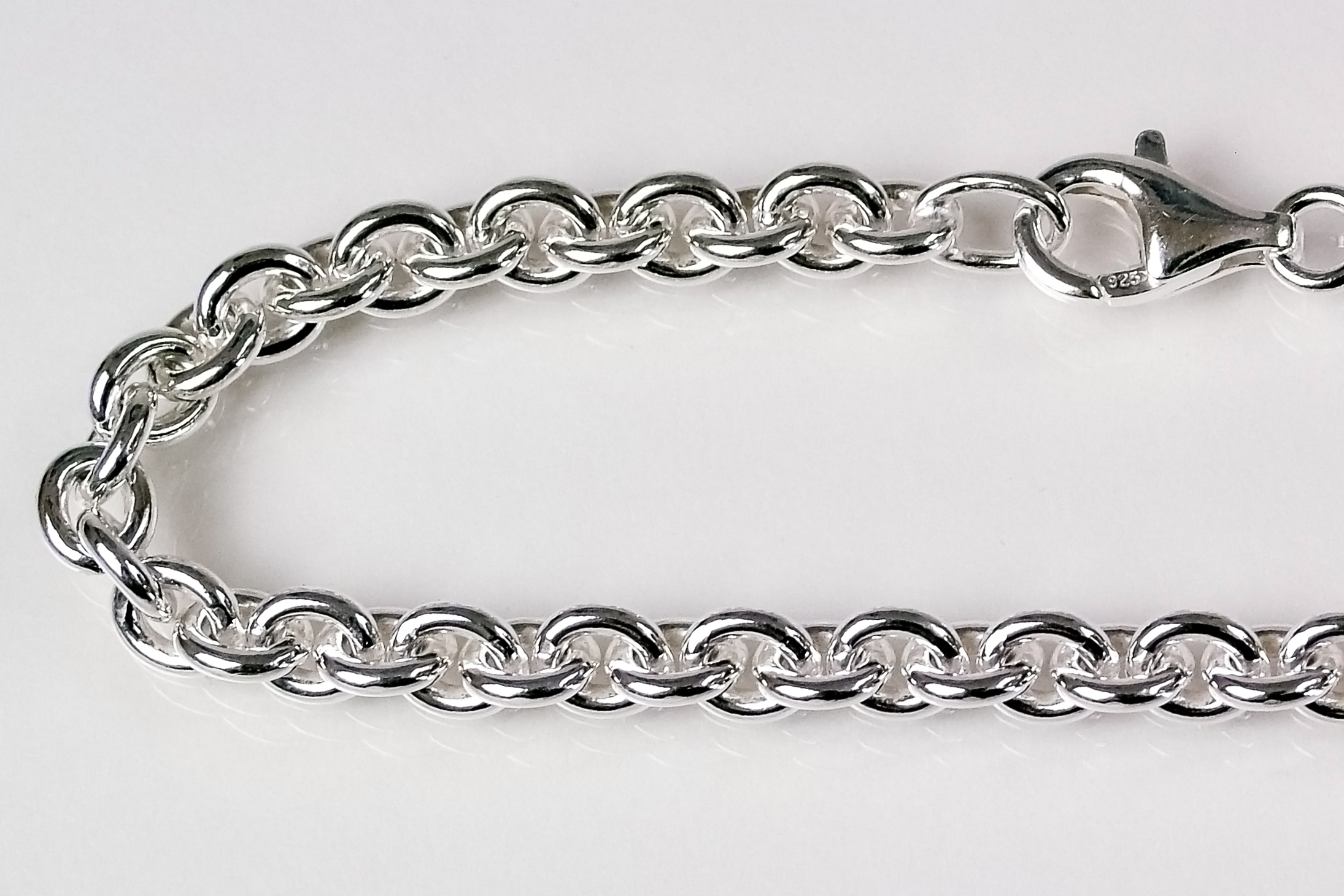
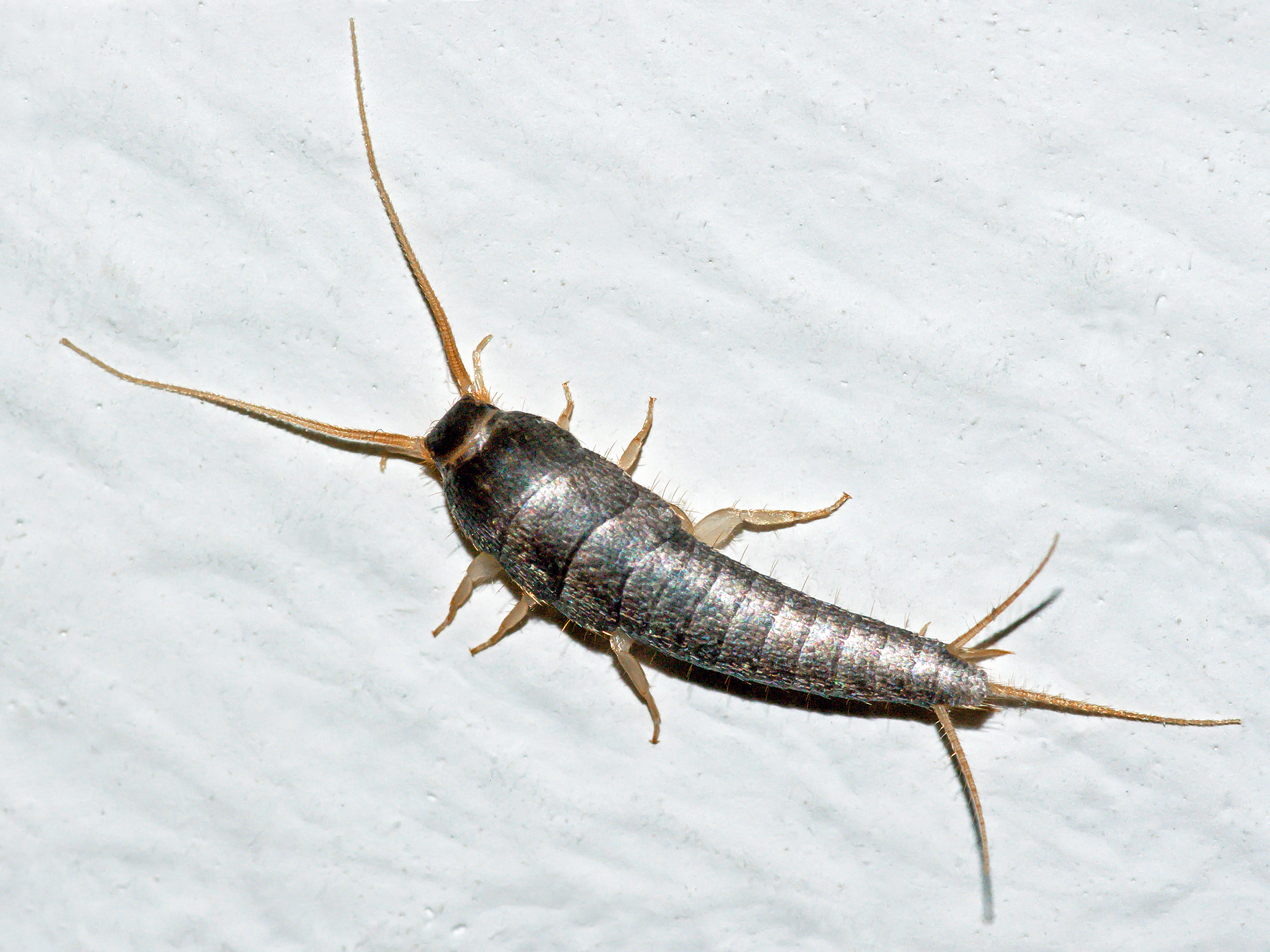
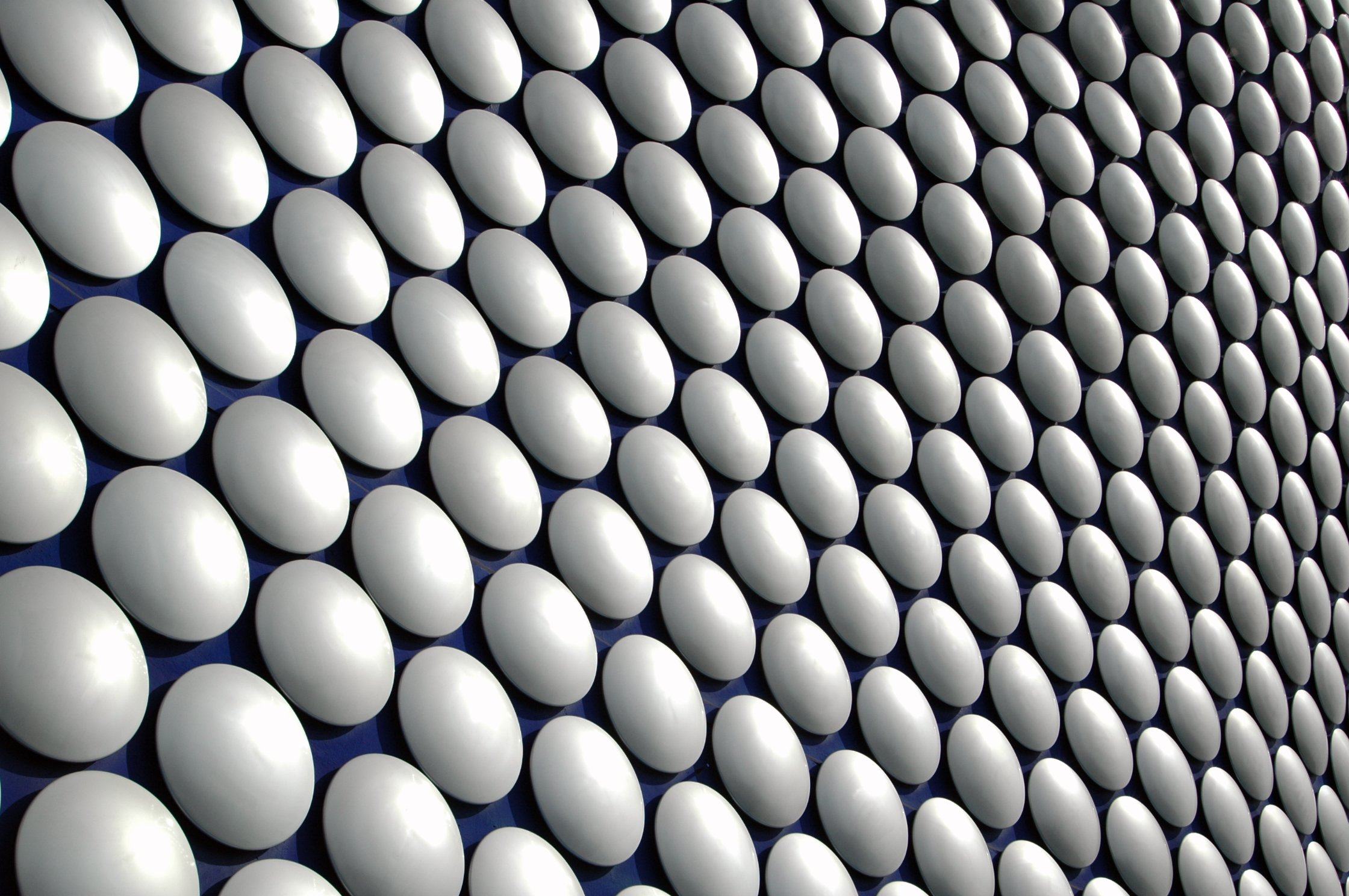
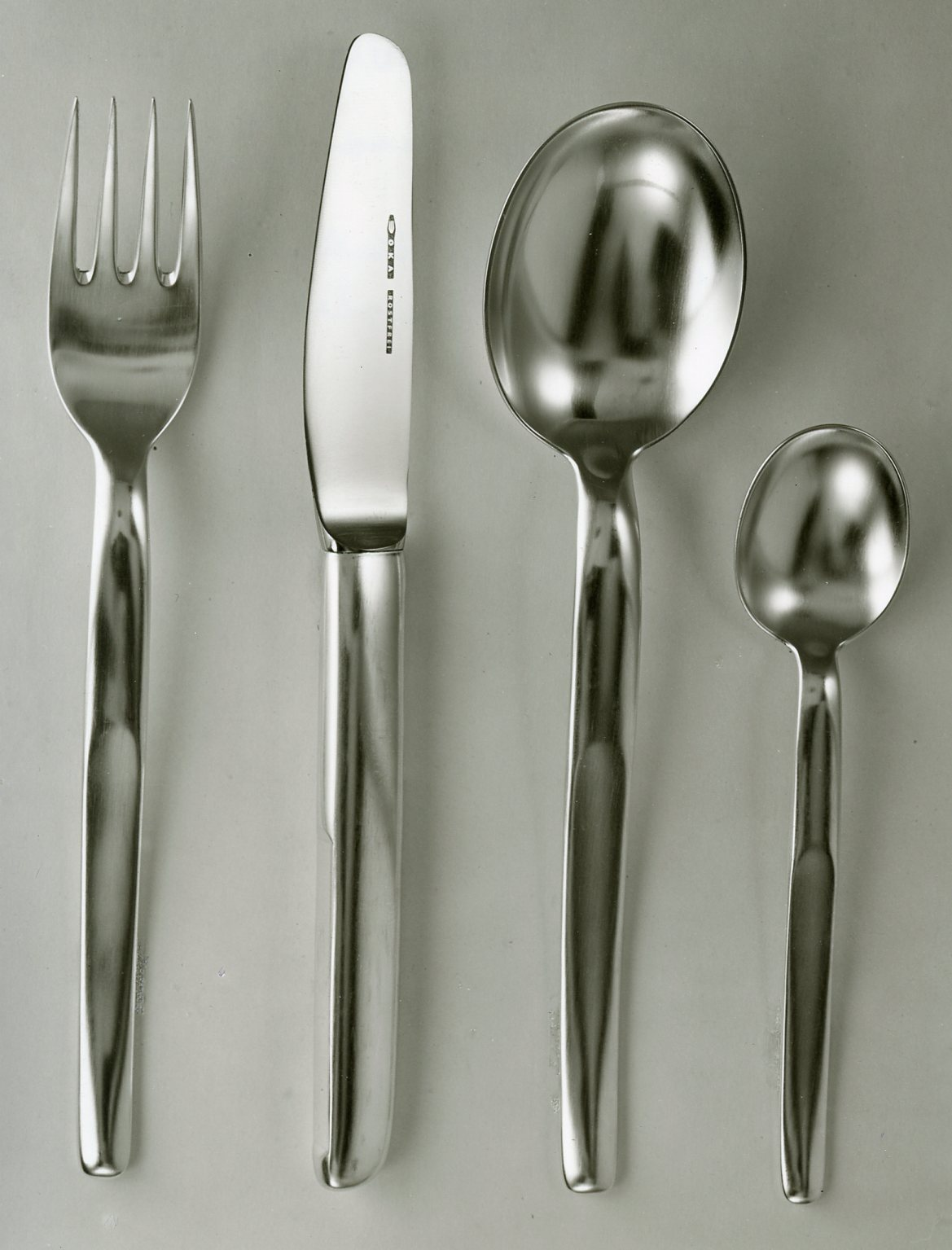
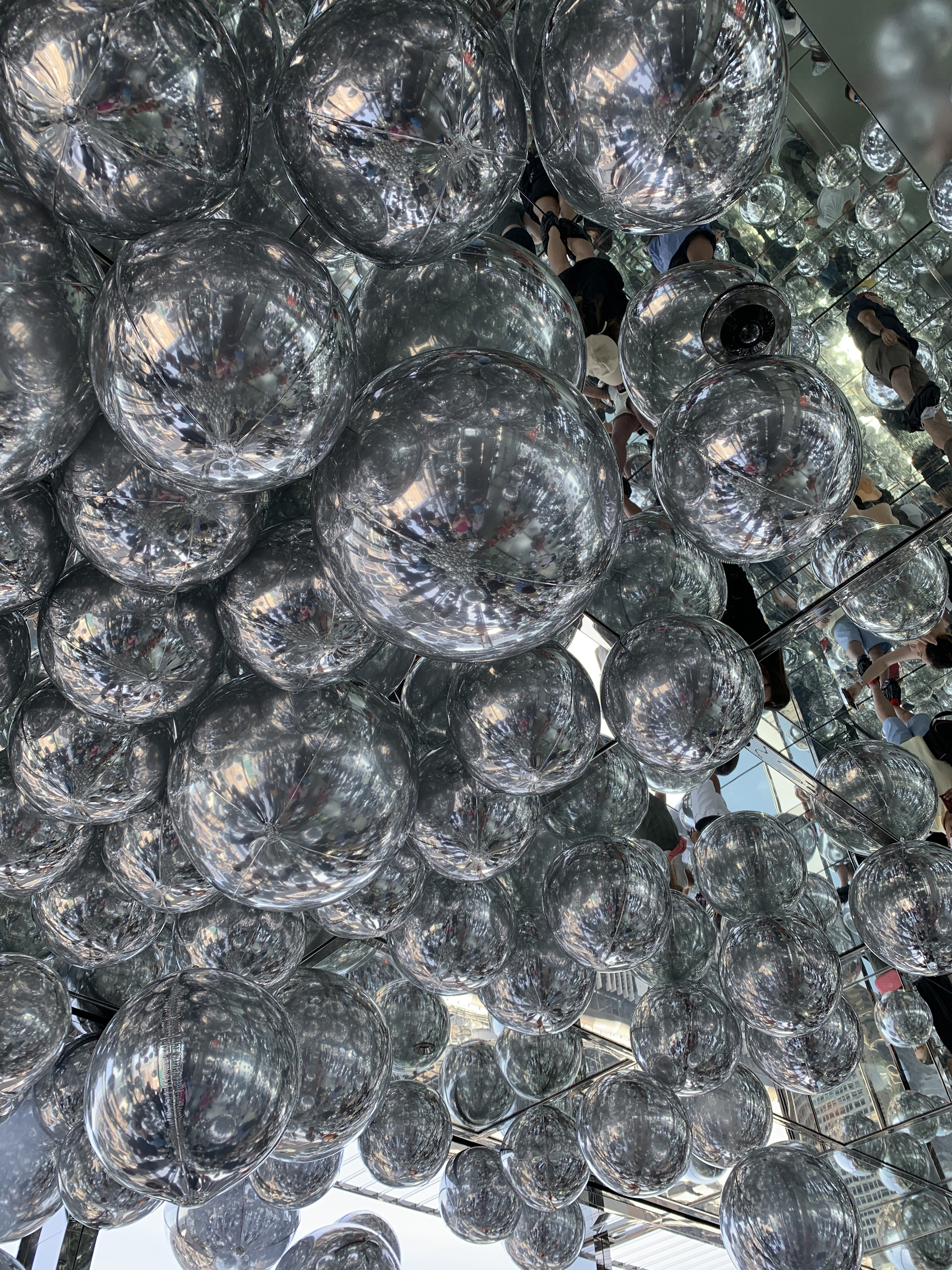
- Clockwise, from top left: Silver bowl; Silver chain; Aluminum discs on the silver exterior of the Selfridges building; Silver balloons in the Summit One Vanderbilt; Examples of silverware; Silverfish.

Common connotations
- Second place in a competition, Wealth

Color coordinates
- Hex triplet: #C0C0C0
- sRGB^{B} (r, g, b): (192, 192, 192)
- HSV (h, s, v): (0°, 0%, 75%)
- CIELCh_{uv} (L, C, h): (78, 0, 0°)
- Source: HTML/CSS
- ISCC–NBS descriptor: Light gray
- B: Normalized to [0–255] (byte)

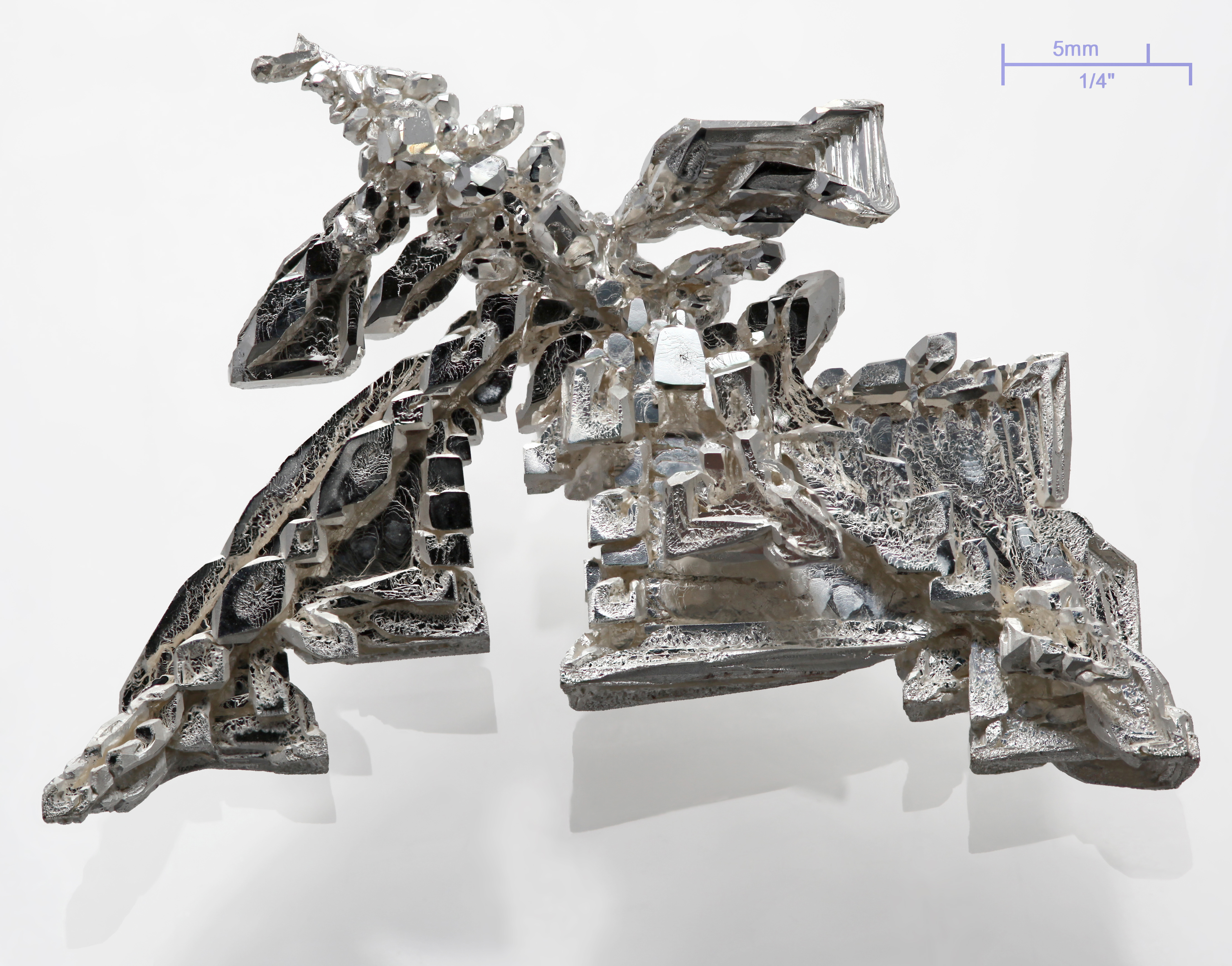
A silver crystal

Silver or metallic gray is a color tone resembling gray that is a representation of the color of polished silver.

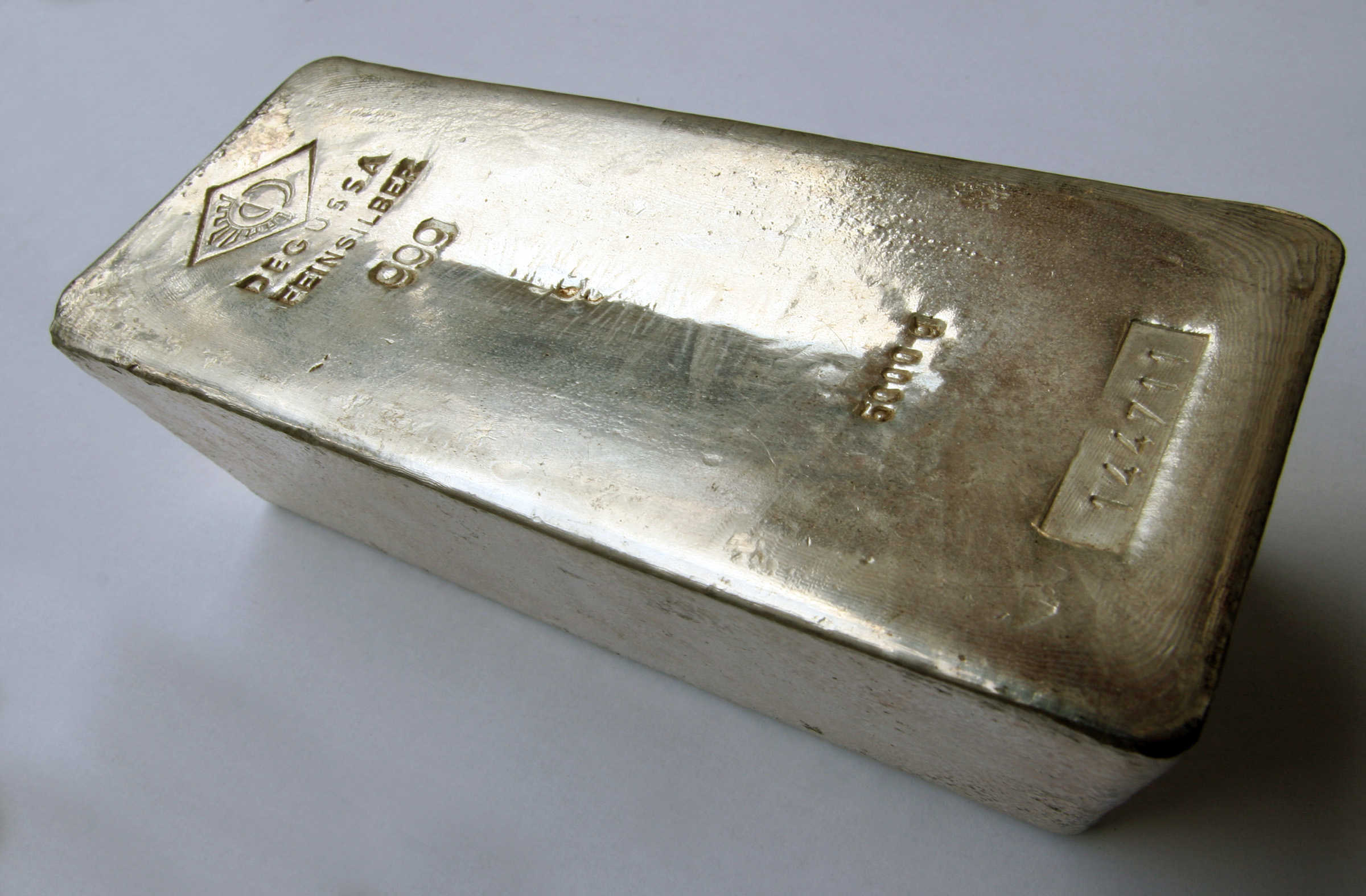
Silver ingot

The visual sensation usually associated with the metal silver is its metallic shine. This cannot be reproduced by a simple solid color because the shiny effect is due to the material's brightness varying with the surface angle to the light source. In addition, there is no mechanism for showing metallic or fluorescent colors on a computer without resorting to rendering software that simulates the action of light on a shiny surface. Consequently, in art and in heraldry, one would typically use a metallic paint that glitters like real silver. A matte gray color could also be used to represent silver.

== History ==
The first recorded use of silver as a color name in English was in 1481. In heraldry, the word argent is used, derived from Latin argentum over Medieval French argent.

== Silver ==
Displayed at right is the web color silver.

Since version 3.2 of HTML "silver" is a name for one of the 16 basic-VGA-colors.

- HTML-example: <body bgcolor="silver">
- CSS-example: body { background-color:silver; }

== Variations of silver ==
=== Silver (Crayola) ===
Silver (Crayola)

Color coordinates
- Hex triplet: #C9C0BB
- sRGB^{B} (r, g, b): (201, 192, 187)
- HSV (h, s, v): (21°, 7%, 79%)
- CIELCh_{uv} (L, C, h): (78, 7, 42°)
- Source: Crayola
- ISCC–NBS descriptor: Yellowish gray
- B: Normalized to [0–255] (byte)

Crayola crayons have a color called silver which is a pale tone of silver color. This silver has been a Crayola color since 1903.

Crayola's silver is not a neutral grayscale color but a warm gray with a very slight tinge of orange-red.

=== Silver pink ===
Silver Pink

Color coordinates
- Hex triplet: #C4AEAD
- sRGB^{B} (r, g, b): (196, 174, 173)
- HSV (h, s, v): (3°, 12%, 77%)
- CIELCh_{uv} (L, C, h): (73, 14, 15°)
- Source: Plochere
- ISCC–NBS descriptor: Grayish yellowish pink
- B: Normalized to [0–255] (byte)

The color silver pink is displayed on the right.

The color name silver pink first came into use in 1948.

The source of this color is the Plochere Color System, a color system formulated in 1948 that is widely used by interior designers.

=== Silver sand ===
Silver Sand

Color coordinates
- Hex triplet: #BFC1C2
- sRGB^{B} (r, g, b): (191, 193, 194)
- HSV (h, s, v): (200°, 2%, 76%)
- CIELCh_{uv} (L, C, h): (78, 2, 221°)
- Source: Xona.com Color List
- ISCC–NBS descriptor: Light greenish gray
- B: Normalized to [0–255] (byte)

On the right is displayed the color silver sand.

The color name silver sand for this silver-tone has been used since 2001 when it was promulgated as one of the colors on the Xona.com Color List.

=== Silver chalice ===
Silver Chalice

Color coordinates
- Hex triplet: #ACACAC
- sRGB^{B} (r, g, b): (172, 172, 172)
- HSV (h, s, v): (0°, 0%, 67%)
- CIELCh_{uv} (L, C, h): (70, 0, 0°)
- Source: Xona.com Color List
- ISCC–NBS descriptor: Light gray
- B: Normalized to [0–255] (byte)

On the right is displayed the color silver chalice.

The color name silver chalice for this tone of silver has been in use since 2001 when it was promulgated as one of the colors on the Xona.com Color List.

=== Roman silver ===
Roman Silver

Color coordinates
- Hex triplet: #838996
- sRGB^{B} (r, g, b): (131, 137, 150)
- HSV (h, s, v): (221°, 13%, 59%)
- CIELCh_{uv} (L, C, h): (57, 12, 250°)
- Source: Resene
- ISCC–NBS descriptor: Bluish gray
- B: Normalized to [0–255] (byte)

On the right is displayed the color Roman silver.

Roman silver, a blue-gray tone of silver, is one of the colors on the Resene Color List.

=== Old silver ===
Old Silver

Color coordinates
- Hex triplet: #848482
- sRGB^{B} (r, g, b): (132, 132, 130)
- HSV (h, s, v): (60°, 2%, 52%)
- CIELCh_{uv} (L, C, h): (55, 2, 86°)
- Source: ISCC-NBS
- ISCC–NBS descriptor: Greenish gray
- B: Normalized to [0–255] (byte)

At right is displayed the color old silver.

Old silver is a color formulated to resemble tarnished silver.

The first recorded use of old silver as a color name in English was in 1905.

The normalized color coordinates for old silver are identical to battleship gray.

=== Sonic silver ===
Sonic Silver

Color coordinates
- Hex triplet: #757575
- sRGB^{B} (r, g, b): (117, 117, 117)
- HSV (h, s, v): (0°, 0%, 46%)
- CIELCh_{uv} (L, C, h): (49, 0, 0°)
- Source: Crayola
- ISCC–NBS descriptor: Dark gray
- B: Normalized to [0–255] (byte)

Sonic silver is a tone of silver included in Metallic FX crayons, specialty crayons formulated by Crayola in 2001.

== Silver in nature ==
Plants

- A silver birch is a tree in the birch family. The leaves are whitish silver on the underside.
- A silver fir is a valuable timber tree that originated in Europe.
- A silver maple is characterized by lacy, delicate leaves that are lighter grayish-green on the underside. These trees get their name from the shimmering effect the two-toned leaves give when fluttering in a breeze.

Animals

- A silverfish is an insect which may eat paper or cloth.
- Many fish have a silver color.
- A silver fox is a "genetically determined phase of the common red fox in which the pelt is black tipped with white".
- A silverback gorilla is an adult male gorilla.

== Silver in culture ==
Aphorisms

- The expression "every cloud has a silver lining" is used to point out that something good can often come out of even a bad situation.
- The expression "silver-tongued" refers to a person who possesses the power of fluent, persuasive, eloquent, and witty speech.
- The expression "born with a silver spoon in his/her mouth" means someone is born into a wealthy or well-to-do family.

Astronomy

- The Chinese name Silver River (銀河) is used throughout East Asia, including Korea and Japan to denote the Milky Way Galaxy (An alternative name for the Milky Way in ancient China, especially in poems, is "Heavenly Han River"(天汉).). In Japanese, "Silver River" (銀河 ginga) means galaxies in general, and the Milky Way is called the "Silver River System" (銀河系 gingakei) or the "River of Heaven" (天の川 Amanokawa or Amanogawa).

Film

- The silver screen is a poetic name for a motion picture screen. This metaphor derived from the early 20th century when all movies were filmed in black and white, and some screens of the era used metallic silver as a reflecting agent.
- Science fiction films often show spaceship or starship crews wearing silver body suits.
- Silver City is a 2004 political satire and drama film written and directed by John Sayles.

Geography

- Nevada is referred to as the silver state because of the historically rich silver mines located there, such as the Comstock Lode.

Gerontology

- The aging of the baby boomers has been called the "silver tsunami", although this phrase is controversial due to its ageist connotations.
- When someone 55 or older gets divorced, it is called a "silver divorce".

Heraldry

- In heraldry there is no distinction between silver and white, represented as "argent".
- In English heraldry argent (silver) or white signified brightness, purity, virtue, or innocence.

Literature

- The Silver Cord is a 1926 play by Sidney Howard about the emotional tie between a mother and a son, and the term "silver cord" is sometimes used to represent this tie.
- Silver Child is the first in The Silver Sequence is a fantasy brook trilogy by Cliff McNish consisting of Silver Child, Silver City and Silver World.
- The Silver Chair is a book in C. S. Lewis's allegorical fantasy series The Chronicles of Narnia.

Marriage

- The 25th wedding anniversary is called the silver anniversary; guests at a 25th wedding anniversary party are expected to bring gifts made of silver. By extension, the 25th anniversary of any significant event is called its Silver Jubilee.

Military

- The Silver Star is the third-highest decoration that can be awarded by the U.S. Military.

Music

- Silver Apples was a psychedelic electronic music duo from New York City that formed in 1967.
- Silverhead was a British band, led by singer/actor Michael Des Barres. They were a part of the glam rock music scene of the early 1970s.
- Silver Convention was a popular disco group.
- Silverchair is a contemporary Australian rock band.
- Silver Fox is a song by RJD2 from his 2002 album Deadringer.

Panelology

- The Silver Surfer is a popular comic book character.
- Silver Fox is a character in the Marvel Comics universe.

Parapsychology

- Those who claim to have had out-of-body experiences sometimes report that they observe a silver cord connecting their astral body to their physical body.

Politics

- The Silver Shirts was an American fascist organization during the 1930s.

Real estate

- The Silverdome, a stadium in Pontiac, Michigan constructed in 1975 for $55,000,000 (about $220,000,000 in 2009 dollars), sold in 2009 for $583,000, symbolizing the collapse of real estate prices in the Detroit metropolitan area due to deindustrialization in the rust belt.

Religion

- In Paganism, silver represents wisdom, intelligence, and memory. It has a feminine energy and it is used to grow psychic ability.

Role playing games

- In Dungeons & Dragons, the silver dragon is one of the metallic dragons.

School colors

- Silver is one of two school colors of Christopher Newport University.

Scouting

- The Silver Wolf Award is the highest award made by The Scout Association "for services of the most exceptional character".
- The Silver Award is the highest award for GS Cadettes in Girl Scouting of the United States of America (GSUSA).

Sexuality

- In the bandana code of the gay leather subculture, wearing a silver lamé bandana on the left means that one is a rock star, movie star, celebrity, or big time groupie; wearing a silver lamé bandana on the right means that one is a groupie looking to have sex with one of the aforementioned types of people.

Sports

- The Las Vegas Raiders of the National Football League and the San Antonio Spurs of the National Basketball Association use silver as one of their primary colors, along with black.
- The Detroit Lions football team uses the color silver along with the color Honolulu blue for its team logo and uniforms.
- In motorsports, Germany is traditionally represented in white. However in 1934 the German teams stripped the paint from their cars to save weight, thus revealing the silver coloured bodywork beneath. They were aptly named the Silver Arrows. Since then, Germany also uses silver as one of their racing colours.

== See also ==
- List of colors
- The Silver Tsunami (metaphor)
