= Karnak (disambiguation) =

Karnak is an ancient Egyptian temple complex.

Karnak or similar may also refer to:

== Karnak ==
- Karnak (band), a Brazilian band
- Karnak (character), a Marvel Comics character
- Karnak, Illinois, a village in Pulaski County, Illinois, United States
- Karnak (typeface), a typeface designed by R. Hunter Middleton
- Karnak, an unincorporated community in Griggs County, North Dakota, United States
- Karnak, a fictional fortification of Adrian Veidt
- Karnak Café (novel), a 1974 novel by Naguib Mahfouz
  - Karnak (film), a 1975 Egyptian film
- Karnak Mountain, a mountain in British Columbia, Canada
- Big Karnak, a 1991 video game
- Queen Karnak, a fictional character in the video game Final Fantasy V
- S.S. Karnak, a fictional ship in the novel Death on the Nile
- SS Karnak (1898), a French passenger ship

== Carnac ==
- Carnac, a commune in Morbihan, Brittany, France
  - Carnac stones, a set of megaliths in Carnac
- Carnac (The Silver Sequence), a fictional character in the novel series The Silver Sequence
- Carnac the Magnificent, a fictional character on the television show The Tonight Show Starring Johnny Carson
- John Carnac (c. 1721–1800), British military officer
- Carnac Island, an island in Western Australia, Australia
- 224592 Carnac, a minor planet

== Karnac/Karnack ==
- Karnac Publishing, a British publisher
- Princess Karnac, Harry Kellar's assistant
- Knowledge Aided Retrieval in Activity Context (KARNAC), terrorist profiling
- Karnack, Texas, an unincorporated community in Harrison County, Texas, United States

== See also ==
- Carnacki, a fictional character created by William Hope Hogdson
