= Cliff McNish =

English author

- Born: Sunderland, England
- Occupation: Writer
- Writing career
- Period: 2000–present
- Genres: Children's fantasy, horror, dark fantasy
- Notable works: The Doomspell Trilogy; Breathe; The Silver Sequence
- Website: www.cliffmcnish.com

Cliff McNish is an English author of fantasy and supernatural novels for young adults. His best-known works include the 2006 ghost novel Breathe, The Silver Sequence, and The Doomspell Trilogy, which has been translated into 26 languages.

== Early life and education ==
McNish was born in Sunderland in the north-east of England. His father, a Marine Engineer, moved south a year later with his wife, and McNish spent most of his childhood in the south east of England.

== Career ==
McNish started writing in 1998 and has been a full-time author since 2003, combining writing with visiting workshops in schools on writing fiction.

Between 2000 and 2003 he released The Doomspell Trilogy, a fantasy trilogy for middle-grade readers consisting of The Doomspell, The Scent of Magic, and The Wizard's Promise, set partly on Earth and also on the Witch Worlds of Ithrea and Ool. The Doomspell novels have been published in 26 languages, with wide readership in the UK and Japan. McNish has cited The Chronicles of Narnia by C.S. Lewis as an influence on the style and characterisation of the trilogy.

The Silver Sequence (2003–2005) followed on immediately from the Doomspell Trilogy, and is a science fiction trilogy primarily for middle-grade and lower-teen readers, consisting of The Silver Child, Silver City, and Silver World. The trilogy concerns six children with unusual powers who are battling to prevent a single vast entity from destroying all life on Earth.

McNish's first stand-alone novel, Breathe: A Ghost Story, was released in 2006, and focuses on a group of ghost children trapped in a house by a Ghost Mother. The book won the Calderdale Award, the Virginia Readers' Choice Award, the Salford Award, and was shortlisted for the Rhode Island Teen Book Award and the Texas Lonestar Awards. In May 2013, Breathe was selected by the UK School Librarians' Network as one of the top 100 adult and children's novels of all time.

This was followed in 2008 by Angel, a teen fantasy novel about a 14-year-old girl whose life is shaped by two angels. The novel incorporates darker themes of teen angst, bullying, and how to behave in the world, and was shortlisted for the North East Teenage fiction Award and the Tayshas Reading List.

Savannah Grey (2010) is a teen horror novel about a 14-year-old girl who is stalked by three monsters. It was nominated for the Carnegie Award in 2011.

The Hunting Ground (2011) is a second ghost novel aimed at older teens, about two brothers who move into an old house inhabited by the ghosts of children who previously died there. It won the Calderdale Award (2013) and the Hillingdon Secondary Book of the Year Award (2013). It was shortlisted for the Lancashire Book of the Year and the Bay Book Award.

Going Home (2014) is a departure from McNish's previous style, a comedy about four dogs stuck in a rescue centre. It was released with illustrations by Trish Phillips.
