= Breathe: A Ghost Story =

2006 novel

- First edition (US)
- Author: Cliff McNish
- Language: English
- Genre: Children's Literature Fiction
- Publisher: Orion Books (UK); Carolrhoda Books (US)
- Publication date: 2006
- Publication place: United Kingdom
- Media type: Print (Paperback)
- Pages: 232 pp
- ISBN: 978-0761349624

Breathe: A Ghost Story is a novel by English author Cliff McNish published in 2006 as McNish's first stand-alone novel. It is about a group of ghost children trapped inside an old farmhouse by a malignant spirit known as the Ghost Mother. Twelve-year-old Jack, suffering from chronic asthma, has just moved into the old house with his widowed mother, and discovers that the Ghost Mother wants him to herself.

== Plot summary ==
Twelve-year-old Jack, a boy with severe asthma that has almost killed him on multiple occasions, has recently lost his father. To help the two of them recover, Jack's mother decides to move them to a 200-year-old farmhouse with much history for Jack to explore. Meanwhile, Jack begins to realize he is developing the ability to communicate with ghosts.

On his first day in the house, Jack senses the presence of others who have inhabited the house since their deaths. He meets four young ghost children – Ann, Oliver, Gwyneth, and Charlie. Jack soon learns that the Ghost Mother, a fifth spirit in the house, has imprisoned the children and feeds off their energy to sustain her own.

Through alternating narratives, the reader learns of the Ghost Mother's past, and the tragedies she faced 150 years earlier involving her young daughter Isabella.

Meanwhile, the Ghost Mother begins to grow fixated on Jack, wishing to have him as her own son. In her desperation, she takes possession of his real mother's body. When Jack doesn't respond the way she'd hoped, the Ghost Mother seeks revenge. A chain of events builds the suspense until Jack's near-death face-off with Ghost Mother, while he races against the clock to save the spirit children trapped in the house.

== Awards ==
Winner of the Calderdale Award, the Virginia Readers’ Choice Award, the Salford Award and shortlisted for the Rhode Island Teen Book Award and the Texas Lonestar Awards, Breathe was voted in May 2013 by The U.K. Schools Library Network as one of the best 100 all time adult and children's novels.
