= List of shipwrecks in December 1876 =

The list of shipwrecks in December 1876 includes ships sunk, foundered, grounded, or otherwise lost during December 1876.

== 1 December ==
List of shipwrecks: 1 December 1876
Ship	State	Description
Crusader	United Kingdom	The steamship was wrecked on the Goodwin Sands, Kent.
Georgette	Western Australia	Georgette The steamship sank in storm in Calgardup Bay, with the loss of twelve lives.
Laxey Mines	(United Kingdom of Great Britain and Ireland) Isle of Man	The ship foundered off Langness. Her crew survived. She was on a voyage from Laxey to Swansea, Glamorgan.
L. O. V. Chapman	United Kingdom	The ship was wrecked at Witless Bay, Newfoundland Colony. She was on a voyage from "Btets Cove" to Liverpool.
Maria Dunan	Italy	The barque was driven ashore in Kilchattan Bay. She was refloated and taken in to Greenock, Renfrewshire, United Kingdom.
Nummer Funf	Germany	The barque ran aground at "Sondre Rosse". She was on a voyage from Hartlepool, County Durham, United Kingdom to Pillau. She was refloated and towed in to Copenhagen, Denmark.
Phillips and Mary	United Kingdom	The ship foundered off Solva, Pembrokeshire.
Pomona	Denmark	The steamship was driven ashore at Gjedser. Her crew were rescued.
Sankt Paul	Denmark	The barque ran aground on the Domesnes Reef, in the Baltic Sea.
Sarah	United Kingdom	The ship foundered off Solva.
William	United Kingdom	The schooner ran aground on the Long Bank, in the Belfast Lough and sank. She was on a voyage from Irvine, Ayrshire to Carrickfergus, County Antrim.
Winston	United Kingdom	The steamship ran aground at Ockachoff, Russia. She was on a voyage from Ockachoff to Falmouth, Cornwall. She was refloated and resumed her voyage.

== 2 December ==
List of shipwrecks: 2 December 1876
Ship	State	Description
Anna Paulowna	Netherlands	The steamship was driven ashore on Terschelling, Friesland, Netherlands. Her crew were rescued. She was on a voyage from Pärnu, Russia to Schiedam, South Holland.
Asia	United Kingdom	The ship was destroyed by fire at Calcutta, India.
Clan Alpine	United Kingdom	The steamship ran aground at Berwick upon Tweed, Northumberland. Her four crew were rescued by the Berwick Lifeboat. She was on a voyage from Berwick upon Tweed to Stirling. She subsequently sank.
Falcon	United Kingdom	The smack was driven ashore and wrecked at Skerries, County Dublin with the loss of three of her four crew. She was on a voyage from Annalong, County Down to Swansea, Glamorgan.
George	United Kingdom	The coble capsized off Cullercoats, Northumberland with the loss of three of her four crew. The survivor was rescued by the Cullercoats Lifeboat.
Jessie	United Kingdom	The ship foundered off the coast of Finistère, France. Her crew were rescued. She was on a voyage from Cardiff, Glamorgan to Aveiro, Portugal.
Lucy	United Kingdom	The ship was abandoned in the Bay of Biscay. Her crew were rescued by Daphne (United Kingdom).
Mabel Jessie	United Kingdom	The schooner foundered off the coast of Finistère, France. Her crew were rescued. She was on a voyage from Newcastle upon Tyne, Northumberland to Aveiro, Portugal and Mazagan, Cuba.
Mikado	Germany	The barque ran aground on the Goodwin Sands, Kent, United Kingdom. She was on a voyage from Hamburg to Bangkok, Siam. She was refloated.
Norsk Veritas	Norway	The barque was driven ashore and wrecked 2 nautical miles (3.7 km) east of Point Lynas, Anglesey, United Kingdom. She was on a voyage from Liverpool, Lancashire, United Kingdom to Christiania.
Prince	United Kingdom	The steamship capsized and sank off South Shields, County Durham with the loss of all fourteen crew. She was on a voyage from Middlesbrough, Yorkshire to Grangemouth, Stirlingshire.
Sarah	United Kingdom	The smack was abandoned in the Irish Sea 4 nautical miles (7.4 km) off Skokholm, Pembrokeshire. Her crew were rescued by the schooner Mersey (United Kingdom). Sarah was on a voyage from Pembroke Dock, Pembrokeshire to Porthgain, Cornwall.
Seven Sons	United Kingdom	The schooner ran aground on the Black Middens, in the North Sea off the mouth of the River Tyne. Her eight crew were rescued by rocket apparatus. She was on a voyage from London to South Shields. She subsequently broke up.
Surprise	United Kingdom	The lugger was wrecked at Balbriggan, County Dublin with the loss of one of her seven crew.
Young Hero	United Kingdom	The ship was driven ashore at Saltfleet, Lincolnshire.
Name uncertain	Flag uncertain	A ship burnt to the waterline, part of her name "dale", was reported in the Atlantic Ocean by Breadalbane (United Kingdom). She may have been the Dalecarlia (United Kingdom), which had departed from Calcutta, India on 30 January 1876 and had rounded the Cape of Good Hope, Cape Colony on 17 July and was posted missing in September.

== 3 December ==
List of shipwrecks: 3 December 1876
Ship	State	Description
Asia	United Kingdom	The ship caught fire at Calcutta, India. She broke her back, was beached and broke in two. She was a total loss.
Bounty	United Kingdom	The ketch was abandoned in the North Sea off South Shields, County Durham.
Cullercoats	United Kingdom	The coble capsized in the North Sea with the loss of both crew.
Delfin	Flag unknown	The ship was wrecked on the coast of Fife, United Kingdom.
Calypso	Germany	The ship driven ashore and severely damaged at Burntisland, Fife.
Emigrant	Sweden	The barque was driven ashore on Inchcolm, Fife. She was refloated and taken in to Leith, Lothian, United Kingdom for repairs.
Fame	United Kingdom	The brigantine was driven ashore at Newcastle, County Down. Her crew were rescued by the HM Coastguard. She was on a voyage from Irvine, Ayrshire to Newry, County Antrim.
Felicie	Norway	The brig was wrecked on the Gar Bank, off the mouth of the River Tay with the loss of all eight crew. She was on a voyage from Exeter, Devon, United Kingdom to Norway.
Gabrielle	France	The schooner was driven ashore on Læsø, Denmark. She was on a voyage from Gothenburg, Sweden to Portmadoc, Caernarfonshire, United Kingdom. She was refloated and taken in to Fredrikshavn, Denmark.
Jane	United Kingdom	The brigantine ran aground on the Pakefield Gat, in the North Sea off the coast of Suffolk. She floated off but was wrecked on the Newcombe Sand. Her crew were rescued by a yawl. She was on a voyage from Newcastle upon Tyne, Northumberland to Cowes, Isle of Wight.
Jeune Elise	France	The lugger foundered in the English Channel with the loss of two of her five crew. Survivors were rescued by Joseph et Marie (France).
Louis Felicie	Flag unknown	The ship was driven ashore and wrecked at Bowmore, Islay, United Kingdom.
Mikao	Germany	The barque ran aground on the Goodwin Sands, Kent, United Kingdom. She was on a voyage from Hamburg to Bangkok, Siam. She was refloated.
Norak Veritas	Norway	The barque was driven ashore and wrecked 2 nautical miles (3.7 km) east of Point Lynas, Anglesey, United Kingdom. She was on a voyage from Liverpool, Lancashire to Christiania.
Olympo	Austria-Hungary	The barque ran aground on the Cross Sand, in the North Sea off the coast of Norfolk, United Kingdom. She was refloated but then ran aground on Scroby Sands. She was again refloated and beached at Great Yarmouth, Norfolk in a waterlogged condition and became a wreck. Her crew were rescued. Olympo was on a voyage from Alexandria, Egypt to Hull.
Rescue	United Kingdom	The brig was driven ashore and wrecked 2 nautical miles (3.7 km) south of Alnmouth, Northumberland. Her seven crew were rescued by rocket apparatus. She was later refloated and towed in to the River Tyne.
Surprise	United Kingdom	The brig was wrecked at Skerries, County Dublin with the loss of one of her seven crew.
Taffvale	United Kingdom	The ship foundered in the North Sea 5 nautical miles (9.3 km) south by west of the Orfordness Lighthouse, Suffolk. She was on a voyage from Middlesbrough, Yorkshire to Swansea, Glamorgan.
Unnamed	United Kingdom	The fishing boat was wrecked at Balbriggan, County Dublin with the loss of three lives.
Unnamed	United Kingdom	The schooner was driven ashore on Mew Island, in the Copeland Islands, County Down. Her crew survived. She was on a voyage from Glasgow, Renfrewshire to Fleetwood, Lancashire.

== 4 December ==
List of shipwrecks: 4 December 1876
Ship	State	Description
Ann Magrett	Norway	The schooner was wrecked at Peterhead, Aberdeenshire, United Kingdom with the loss of all eight crew.
Belle of Southesk	United Kingdom	The barque was driven ashore at Cape Korowelang, Netherlands East Indies. She was on a voyage from Bangkok, Siam to Samarang, Netherlands East Indies.
Brenda	United Kingdom	The ship ran aground on the Lappegrund, in the Baltic Sea. She was on a voyage from Riga, Russia to Alloa, Clackmannanshire.
Change	United Kingdom	The fishing smack was abandoned in the North Sea. She was driven ashore and wrecked at Blakeney, Norfolk the next day.
Dryad	United Kingdom	The smack was driven ashore at Lerwick, Shetland Islands .
Eliza Ann	United Kingdom	The smack was driven ashore and severely damaged at "Coulstone", near Bideford, Devon.
Emma and Carl	United Kingdom	The ship capsized in the Atlantic Ocean (58°10′N 3°00′W) with the loss of eight of her thirteen crew. Survivors were rescued by Ernest (Germany). Emma and Carl was on a voyage from New York, United States to Stralsund, Germany. She subsequently came ashore at Haroldswick, Unst, Shetland Islands, United Kingdom and was wrecked.
Fama	Norway	The ship was driven ashore on Møn, Denmark.
Flora	United Kingdom	The schooner was wrecked on the Kentish Knock. Her crew were rescued.
Flora	United Kingdom	The schooner was driven ashore at Karrebæksminde, Denmark. She was on a voyage from Newcastle upon Tyne, Northumberland to Karrebæksminde.
Hinrike	Flag unknown	The ship was driven ashore at the mouth of the Llobregat. She was on a voyage from Guayaquil, Ecuador to Barcelona, Spain. She was refloated and towed in to Barcelona in a leaky condition.
Idolph	Germany	The ship ran aground on the Drum Sands, in the Firth of Forth. Her five crew were rescued by the steamship Albicore (United Kingdom). Idolph was on a voyage from Burntisland, Fife, United Kingdom to Tønning.
Jupiter	Germany	The ship ran aground at "Tuborm", Denmark. She was on a voyage from Sunderland, County Durham, United Kingdom to Wolgast.
Liberty	United Kingdom	The ship was abandoned off Portland, Dorset. She was towed in to Weymouth, Dorset.
Luis A. Martinez	United States	The ship ran aground on the Ants Sands. She was on a voyage from Baltimore, Maryland to Boston, Massachusetts.
Medusa	Canada	The barque was abandoned at sea. Her crew were rescued by the steamship Prince Edward ( Canada). Medusa was on a voyage from Prince Edward Island to London, United Kingdom.
Minnie Cameron	United Kingdom	The barque foundered at sea. Her eleven crew were rescued by the barque Rosa Madre (Italy). Minnie Cameron was on a voyage from Troon, Ayrshire to Caldera, Chile.
Moses	Norway	The schooner was wrecked at Rattray Head, Aberdeenshire with the loss of all eight crew.
Otago	New Zealand	Otago The 642-ton steamer hit rocks at Chasland's Mistake, on the Catlins Coast in thick fog while en route from Dunedin to Melbourne, Victoria and was wrecked. All on board were rescued by the steamer Express (New Zealand).
Repart	Norway	The schooner was wrecked at Peterhead with the loss of all eight crew. She was on a voyage from Leith, Lothian, United Kingdom to Arendal.
Sigrid Elizabeth	Sweden	The schooner collided with the brig Norma (Germany) and the barque Dr. V. Grefe (Flag unknown) off the mouth of the River Carron and was abandoned by her crew. She was boarded by the crew of Norma and towed in to Grangemouth, Stirlingshire, United Kingdom by the tug Venus (United Kingdom). Dr. V. Grefe put in a claim for salvage.
Steadfast	United Kingdom	The smack was wrecked on the Haisborough Sands, in the North Sea off the coast of Norfolk with the loss of two of her crew. Survivors were rescued by a lugger.
Svante	Sweden	The brig was driven ashore in the River Eden. Her eight crew were rescued. She was on a voyage from Newcastle upon Tyne to Visby.
Tamo	Norway	The ship was driven ashore at Stege, Denmark. She was on a voyage from Sundsvall, Sweden to Dundee, Forfarshire, United Kingdom.
Wohldorf	Germany	The barque ran aground at Harwich, Essex, United Kingdom. She was refloated with assistance.

== 5 December ==
List of shipwrecks: 5 December 1876
Ship	State	Description
Alarm	(United Kingdom of Great Britain and Ireland) Jersey	The smack foundered in the Atlantic Ocean 60 nautical miles (110 km) north west of the Longships, Cornwall. Her crew took to a boat; they were rescued off Lundy Island, Devon on 7 December by Star of Scilly (United Kingdom). Alarm was on a voyage from Cork to Jersey.
Anna	Denmark	The ship departed from Cromarty, United Kingdom for Nyborg. No further trace, posted missing.
Arran Maid	United Kingdom	The schooner was driven ashore on the Isle of Arran. Her crew were rescued. She was on a voyage from Ballachulish, Argyllshire to Kirkwall, Orkney Islands.
Betty Sauber	Germany	The steamship ran aground off Lindisfarne, Northumberland, United Kingdom. She was on a voyage from Hamburg to Sunderland, County Durham, United Kingdom. She was refloated and taken in to Sunderland for repairs.
Clio	Germany	The brig struck a rock off Arendal, Norway and foundered. She was on a voyage from Newcastle upon Tyne, Northumberland to Rostock.
Corsewall	United Kingdom	The steamship ran aground on the Cow and Calf Reef, off Roche's Point, County Cork. She was on a voyage from Glasgow, Renfrewshire to Cork. She was declared a total loss. Corsewall broke up on 2 January 1877.
Ellen Frances	United States	The schooner sailed from Souris, Prince Edward Island, Canada on 5 December for Gloucester, Massachusetts and vanished. Probably sank in the gales of 9–11 December. Lost with all five crew.
Emilie	France	The brigantine struck the pier and sank at Havre de Grâce, Seine-Inférieure. She was on a voyage from Swansea, Glamorgan, United Kingdom to Havre de Grâce.
Jupiter	Germany	The brig ran aground at Copenhagen, Denmark. She was on a voyage from Grangemouth, Stirlingshire, United Kingdom to Wolgast.
Ludwig	Sweden	The barque ran aground at Copenhagen. She was on a voyage from Lübeck, Germany to Visby.
Marion	United Kingdom	The schooner ran aground on the Woolpack Sand, in The Wash. She was on a voyage from Christiania, Norway to Poole, Dorset. She was refloated and taken in to Grimsby, Lincolnshire in a leaky condition.
Patriot	United Kingdom	The smack sank off Crinan, Argyllshire. Her crew were rescued. She was on a voyage from Cullipool, Argyllshire to Glasgow.
Thomas and Anne	United Kingdom	The schooner sprang a leak and sank on the Brazil Bank, in Liverpool Bay. Both crew were rescued. She was on a voyage from Bangor, Caernarfonshire to Runcorn, Cheshire.
Twee Gebroeders	Belgium	The barge collided with the steamship Guadiana (Brazil and sank at Antwerp.
Vesper	United Kingdom	The steamship was wrecked at Arbroath, Forfarshire. Her nine crew were rescued by rocket apparatus. She was on a voyage from Sunderland, County Durham to Montrose, Forfarshire.
Unnamed	Flag unknown	The schooner foundered off Portland, Dorset, United Kingdom with the loss of all hands.

== 6 December ==
List of shipwrecks: 6 December 1876
Ship	State	Description
Alba	Italy	The barque ran aground at Queenstown, County Cork, United Kingdom. She was on a voyage from Berdyanski, Russia to Dover, Kent, United Kingdom.
Amanda	United Kingdom	The ship ran aground and sank at Grangemouth, Stirlingshire. She was on a voyage from Gävle, Sweden to Grangemouth.
Carl Constantine	Germany	The ship was wrecked on Fair Isle, United Kingdom with the loss of two of her nine crew. She was on a voyage from South Shields, County Durham, United Kingdom to Kiel. The survivors were taken off the island on 16 January 1877 by the steamship St. Clair (United Kingdom).
Francisco	United Kingdom	The ship was abandoned at sea. Her crew were rescued She was on a voyage from Pori, Grand Duchy of Finland to Hull, Yorkshire.
Henry	Norway	The barque was driven ashore at Penmarc'h, Finistère, France.
Index	United Kingdom	The barque was abandoned in the Atlantic Ocean. Her crew were rescued by Angollies (Flag unknown). Index was on a voyage from Greenock, Renfrewshire to Genoa, Italy.
Jane and Elizabeth	United Kingdom	The ship was driven ashore at Grey Point, County Antrim. She was on a voyage from "Redbay" to Belfast, County Antrim.
Lotus	Canada	The schooner was driven ashore at Southend. She was later refloated.
Petsenelle	Flag unknown	The brigantine departed from Newcastle upon Tyne, Northumberland, United Kingdom for Kiel, Germany. No further trace, presumed foundered with the loss of all hands.
Princess Royal	United Kingdom	The ship ran aground near Oskarshamn, Sweden. She was on a voyage from Norrköping to Oskarshamn. She was refloated with the assistance of two steamships and towed in to Oskarshamn.
Thyra	United Kingdom	The schooner collided with another vessel and sank in the North Sea with the loss of a crew member.

== 7 December ==
List of shipwrecks: 7 December 1876
Ship	State	Description
Agostina	United Kingdom	The barque was abandoned in the Atlantic Ocean. Her crew were rescued by the barque Desti Dubrovski (Austria-Hungary). Agostina was on a voyage from Philadelphia, Pennsylvania, United States to Hamburg, Germany.
Anna Olga	Russia	The schooner was driven ashore and wrecked on Læsø, Denmark. She was on a voyage from Kotka to Lübeck, Germany.
Astarte	United Kingdom	The steamship ran aground off Skagen, Denmark. She was on a voyage from Reval, Russia to Hull, Yorkshire. She was refloated on 14 December with assistance from a steamship and put in to Copenhagen, Denmark.
Carl Friedrich	Germany	The ship departed from Grangemouth, Stirlingshire, United Kingdom for Rostock. No further trace, reported missing.
Cecile	Denmark	The ship departed from Hartlepool, County Durham, United Kingdom for Thisted. No further trace, posted missing.
Eustace	United Kingdom	The brig sank off Zandvoort, South Holland, Netherlands. Her crew were rescued by the fishing smack Sailor's Home. Eustace was on a voyage from Sunderland, County Durham to Dordrecht, South Holland.
George	South Australia	The steamship was wrecked near "Nasse". Twenty of the 70 people on board were reported missing. She was on a voyage from Fremantle, Western Australia to Adelaide.
Thalia	United Kingdom	The snow departed from Oran, Algeria for Berwick upon Tweed, Northumberland or Leith, Lothian. No further trace, reported missing.

== 8 December ==
List of shipwrecks: 8 December 1876
Ship	State	Description
Andalusia	United Kingdom	The steamship ran aground. She was on a voyage from Grangemouth, Stirlingshire to Middlesbrough, Yorkshire. She was refloated and taken in to Middlesbrough.
Baltic	United Kingdom	The schooner was driven ashore at Breaksea Point, Glamorgan.
Galvanic	United Kingdom	The steamship ran aground at Belfast, County Antrim. She was on a voyage from Belfast to Liverpool, Lancashire.
Howard Steele	United States	The fishing schooner was last sighted on this date. Presumed foundered with the loss of all five crew.
Johanna	Germany	The ship was abandoned at sea. Her crew survived.
Naruen	Norway	The barque capsized at Rotterdam, South Holland, Netherlands.
Robert Emmett	United States	The fishing schooner departed from Eastport, Maine. No further trace, presumed foundered with the loss of all nine crew.
Woodham	United Kingdom	The steamship sank at Lisbon, Portugal. Her 24 crew survived. She was on a voyage from Odesa, Russia to Falmouth, Cornwall.

== 9 December ==
List of shipwrecks: 9 December 1876
Ship	State	Description
Archimede	France	The schooner struck a sunken wreck and then ran aground on the Haisborough Sands, in the North Sea off the coast of Norfolk, United Kingdom. She broke her back and was a total loss. Her crew were rescued by the schooner Hope (United Kingdom). Archimede was on a voyage from Middlesbrough, Yorkshire, United Kingdom to Nantes, Loire-Inférieure.
Dia Matrone	Russia	The barque ran aground on the Haisborough Sands and was abandoned by her crew. She was on a voyage from Riga to Chatham, Kent. She was on a voyage from Riga to Chatham, Kent, United Kingdom. She was refloated on 16 December with assistance from the steamship Thomas Eccles (United Kingdom) and taken in to The Wolds.
Elizabeth	United Kingdom	The schooner collided with the fishing trawler Wonder (United Kingdom) and sank in the Irish Sea 11 nautical miles (20 km) south of the Bahamas Lightship ( Trinity House). Her crew were rescued by Wonder.
General Butler	United States	Carrying passengers and a cargo of approximately 30 short tons (27 t) of marble, the 88-foot (27 m) schooner ran onto a breakwater in Lake Champlain at Burlington, Vermont, during a storm. All on board jumped to the breakwater and were rescued by a local ship chandler and his son in a 14-foot (4.3 m) boat. General Butler sank in 40 feet (12 m) of water about 200 feet (61 m) west of the south end of the breakwater at 44°28.3′N 073°13.7′W.
Idun	United Kingdom	The barque ran aground in the Tonalá River. She was on a voyage from Liverpool, Lancashire to Minatitlán, Mexico.
Maria	United Kingdom	The barque was driven ashore on "Alsen". She was on a voyage from Sunderland, County Durham to Kiel, Germany.
Nathaniel	United Kingdom	The ship was abandoned in the North Sea. Her crew were rescued. She was on a voyage from She was on a voyage from Hull, Yorkshire to Copenhagen, Denmark.
R. Dyreborg	Denmark	The brigantine was abandoned in the North Sea. Her crew were rescued by a Norwegian vessel. She was on a voyage from Nakskov, Denmark to Hull, Yorkshire, United Kingdom.
Woodham	United Kingdom	The steamship sank in the Atlantic Ocean 3 nautical miles (5.6 km) off Lisbon, Portugal. She was en route from Odesa, Russia, to Fremantle, Western Australia.
Unnamed	Flag unknown	The schooner ran aground on the Maplin Sand, in the North Sea off the coast of Essex, United Kingdom.

== 10 December ==
List of shipwrecks: 10 December 1876
Ship	State	Description
Amadine	United Kingdom	The barque was destroyed by fire at sea. Her crew were rescued. She was on a voyage from London to Penang, Straits Settlements.
Bornholm	Denmark	The steamship was driven ashore on the coast of Jutland. She was on a voyage from Stettin, Germany to Copenhagen and London. She was refloated and taken in to Gothenburg, Sweden.
Cambria	Netherlands	The ship ran aground at Hellevoetsluis, Zeeland. She was on a voyage from Liepāja, Russia to Schiedam, South Holland. She was refloated with the assistance of two tugs and taken in to Hellevoetsluis.
Cibrita	Netherlands	The ship ran aground on the Hinderbank, in the North Sea off the coast of Zeeland. she was on a voyage from Liepāja, Courland Governorate to Schiedam South Holland.
Daniel A. Burnham	United States	The fishing schooner capsized and was abandoned on the Grand Banks of Newfoundland. Her crew were rescued.
General Nott	United Kingdom	The brig was driven ashore at East London, Cape Colony.
Jane Grey	United Kingdom	The ship was damaged by fire at King's Lynn, Norfolk.
Königen von Preussen	Germany	The barque was abandoned in the North Sea. Her crew were rescued by the barque Hebe (United Kingdom). Königen von Preussen was on a voyage from Hartlepool, County Durham, United Kingdom to Danzig.
Queen Victoria	Norway	The barque was abandoned off the Pentland Skerries, United Kingdom. Her crew were rescued.
Rinaldo	United Kingdom	The steamship ran aground near Alexandria, Egypt. She was on a voyage from Newcastle upon Tyne, Northumberland to Alexandria. She was refloated and taken in to Alexandria.
Rose	United Kingdom	The smack was driven ashore and wrecked on Tory Island, County Donegal. Her crew were rescued. She was on a voyage from Ballyshannon, County Antrim to Ipswich, Suffolk.
Samuel Dixon	United Kingdom	The schooner ran aground on the Slough Rock. She was on a voyage from Newport, Monmouthshire to Wexford. She was refloated and taken in to Wexford.
Sker	United Kingdom	The schooner ran aground on the Slough Rock. She was refloated but was then wrecked on the Carrig Rock. She was on a voyage from Newport to Wexford.

== 11 December ==
List of shipwrecks: 11 December 1876
Ship	State	Description
Balclutha	United Kingdom	The ship departed from Saint John's, Newfoundland Colony for Bristol, Gloucestershire. No further trace, reported missing.
Camilla	Austria-Hungary	The barque was driven ashore and wrecked at Cape Samoulia, Ottoman Empire. She was on a voyage from Odesa, Russia to an English port.
Celina	France	The lugger struck a breakwater and sank at the Elizabeth Castle, Saint Helier, Jersey, Channel Islands. Her crew survived. She was on a voyage from Saint-Malo, Ille-et-Vilaine to Saint Helier.
Circassian	United Kingdom	The sailing ship went ashore on Long Island west of the Bridgehampton, New York Life Saving Station in a gale with thick snow and heavy seas. All 78 people on board were rescued by the United States Life Saving Service. She was on a voyage from Liverpool, Lancashire, United Kingdom to New York. A salvage company was hired to refloat her. On 29 December a gale hit the area. In the early hours of 30 December she broke in two, then broke up. Of the 16 crew and 16 wrecking employees on board at the time only three crewmen and one wrecking employee survived.
H. L.	France	The lugger foundered in the Benequet Passage. She was on a voyage from the Île de Ré, Charente-Inférieure to Nantes, Loire-Inférieure.
Lancet	United States	The fishing schooner was abandoned on the Georges Bank. One of the crew washed overboard and drowned.
Sir George Seymour	United Kingdom	The fishing smack collided with the fishing smack Undaunted and sank in Start Bay with the loss of a crew member.

== 12 December ==
List of shipwrecks: 12 December 1876
Ship	State	Description
Alarm	United Kingdom	The smack ran aground 60 nautical miles (110 km) north west of the Longships Lighthouse, Cornwall. Her crew took to a boat; they were rescued two days later by a schooner.
Bucephalus	United Kingdom	The ship ran aground on the Varne Sand. She was on a voyage from South Shields, County Durham to Cartagena, Spain. She was refloated and taken in to Margate, Kent.
England's Beauty	United Kingdom	The ship departed from Harbour Grace, Newfoundland Colony for Plymouth, Devon. No further trace, reported missing.
Hanna Rathkens	Germany	The ship was wrecked on the Goodwin Sands, Kent, United Kingdom with the loss of one of her twelve crew. Survivors were rescued by the tug Aid (United Kingdom).
Huddersfield, Robert Kelly	United KingdomUnited States	The barques collided and sank in the English Channel 30 nautical miles (56 km) off Portland, Dorset. Huddersfield sank with the loss of fifteen of her seventeen crew. She was on a voyage from London to Kurrachee, India. Survivors were rescued by Robert Kelly, which was on a voyage from Havre de Grâce, Seine-Inférieure, France to Tybee Island, Georgia. She subsequently sank; all nineteen people on board were rescued by Avoca (United Kingdom).
Jean Bart	France	The sloop collided with the brig Nina (United Kingdom) and sank in the Gull Stream. Her crew survived. Jean Bart was on a voyage from Clackmannan, United Kingdom to Fécamp, Seine-Inférieure.
William Ackers	New Zealand	The 299-ton barque was wrecked on a reef at Waipapa Point, Foveaux Strait, New Zealand. She was en route from Bluff with a cargo of timber. The lifeboat was launched, but was inundated by the heavy sea. Eight of the 11 people on board were lost.

== 13 December ==
List of shipwrecks: 13 December 1876
Ship	State	Description
Anenome	United Kingdom	The schooner collided with the barque Hannah Parr (Norway) in the English Channel 14 nautical miles (26 km) south south west of Portland, Dorset and was abandoned by her crew. Two reached shore in a boat, the rest were rescued by Hannah Parr. Anenome was on a voyage from London to Safi, Morocco. She foundered off Portland, Dorset the next day.
Aphrodite	Germany	The barque ran aground at Stavanger, Norway. She was on a voyage from Hartlepool, County Durham, United Kingdom to Landskrona, Sweden.
Camilla	Austria-Hungary	The barque was wrecked at Cape Samould, Ottoman Empire. She was on a voyage from Odesa, Russia to an English port.
Commerce	United Kingdom	The Mersey Flat was run into by the tug Toiler (United Kingdom) and sank in the River Mersey.
Constantia	Sweden	The barque ran aground off Kolnes, Norway and was severely damaged. She was on a voyage from Dieppe, Seine-Inférieure, France to Lysekil. She was refloated and towed in to Tanager, Denmark by the tug Ryfylke (Denmark). She was placed under repair.
Edward	United Kingdom	The brig was driven ashore at Holyhead, Anglesey. She was on a voyage from Workington, Cumberland to Llanelly, Glamorgan. She was refloated the next day and taken in to Holyhead.
Exhibition	United Kingdom	The schooner sprang a leak and was beached at the Landguard Fort, Felixtowe, Suffolk and was abandoned by her five crew. She was on a voyage from Newcastle upon Tyne, Northumberland to London.
Irene	United Kingdom	The barque ran aground in the Menai Strait at Gallows Point, Beaumaris, Anglesey. She was on a voyage from Caernarfon to Bangor, Caernarfonshire.
Jessica	United Kingdom	The ship ran aground at Chittagong, India. She was on a voyage from Liverpool, Lancashire to Chittagong.
Louvain	Belgium	The steamship ran aground in the River Thames at East Greenwich, Kent, United Kingdom. She was refloated and resumed her voyage.
Marie	Denmark	The brig was abandoned in the North Sea. She was on a voyage from Landskrona to London. She was taken in to Hull, Yorkshire, United Kingdom.
Mavis	United Kingdom	The steamship ran aground at "Rassen", near Vlissingen, Zeeland, Netherlands. She was on a voyage from Taganrog, Russia to Antwerp, Belgium. She was refloated.
Mechanic	United Kingdom	The ship ran aground on the Abill Rock. She was on a voyage from Liverpool, Lancashire to Drogheda, County Louth. She was refloated with assistance from the steamship Amphion (United Kingdom) and taken in to the Carlingford Lough.
Premier	United Kingdom	The barque foundered off Souter Point, Northumberland. Her crew were rescued by the tug Storm King (United Kingdom). Premier was on a voyage from South Shields, County Durham to Middlesbrough, Yorkshire.
Rosetta Padre	Flag unknown	The ship ran aground at Waterford, United Kingdom. She was on a voyage from Baltimore, Maryland, United States to Waterford. She was refloated and towed in to Waterford.
Union	United Kingdom	The ship was damaged by fire at New Orleans, Louisiana, United States.
Vesta	United Kingdom	The schooner was driven ashore at Ayr. She was on a voyage from Penzance, Cornwall to Ayr. She was refloated.

== 14 December ==
List of shipwrecks: 14 December 1876
Ship	State	Description
Astarte	United Kingdom	The steamship was driven ashore on Skagen, Denmark. She was on a voyage from Hull, Yorkshire to Reval, Russia. She was refloated with the assistance of a steamship and taken in to Copenhagen, Denmark.
Baroness Strathspey	United Kingdom	The ship ran aground at Findhorn, Moray. She was on a voyage from Sunderland, County Durham, to Burghead, Moray. She was refloated the next day and taken in to Burghead in a leaky condition.
Elgin	United Kingdom	The schooner was driven ashore and wrecked at Casablanca, Morocco. Her crew were rescued.
Fairy Belle	United States	The ship was driven ashore at Wilmington, Delaware. She was on a voyage from Wilmington to Rio de Janeiro, Brazil. She was refloated and resumed her voyage.
Freden	Norway	The barque was lost off Cabo da Roca, Portugal. Her crew were rescued by the steamship Oporto (United Kingdom). Freden was on a voyage from Kristiansand to Lisbon, Portugal.
Huma	United Kingdom	The barque ran aground on the Hittarp Reef, in the Baltic Sea. She was on a voyage from Danzig, Germany to London. She was refloated and assisted in to Copenhagen, Denmark.
Ino	United Kingdom	The brig was abandoned in the Atlantic Ocean. Her crew were rescued by the steamship Baltimore (Germany). Ino was on a voyage from the Bull River to Dublin.
Kantete	Sweden	The ship was driven ashore at "Hasalo". She was on a voyage from Middlesbrough, Yorkshire, United Kingdom to Karlskrona.
Kent	United Kingdom	The barque was driven ashore at Blackwall, Middlesex. She was on a voyage from London to a Mediterranean port. She was refloated and resumed her voyage.
Melligan	United Kingdom	The ship ran aground and was wrecked at Burghead, Moray. She was refloated the next day and taken in to Burghead.
Ocean Pearl	United Kingdom	The schooner collided with the Mersey Flat Enterprise (United Kingdom) and was beached at Birkenhead, Cheshire.
Pollies	United Kingdom	The smack was driven ashore 3 nautical miles (5.6 km) south of Scarborough, Yorkshire.
Three Sisters	United Kingdom	The brigantine collided with the barque Annetta (United Kingdom) and sank off Maidens, Argyllshire with the loss of her captain. Survivors were rescued by Anetta.
Upapa	United Kingdom	The steamship collided with the schooner Avoca (United Kingdom) at Woolwich, Kent and was severely damaged. She was on a voyage from London to Cork. She put back to London.
Unnamed	United Kingdom	The steamship foundered off the Smalls Lighthouse, Cornwall, United Kingdom. She may have collided with another steamship .

== 15 December ==
List of shipwrecks: 15 December 1876
Ship	State	Description
Dunleary	United Kingdom	The brigantine was driven ashore at Dulas, Anglesey. She was on a voyage from Liverpool, Lancashire to Kingstown, County Dublin.
Favorit	Norway	The schooner was abandoned at sea. Her crew were rescued. She was on a voyage from Grangemouth, Stirlingshire, United Kingdom to Christiania.
Jeanie	Victoria	The ship departed from New York, United States for Penarth, Glamorgan, United Kingdom. No further trace, reported missing.
J. F. Huntress	United States	The fishing schooner was sighted on the LaHave Banks. No further trace, presumed foundered with the loss of all ten crew.
Russell	United Kingdom	The schooner struck the pier at South Shields, County Durham and sank. Her four crew survived.
Three Sisters	United Kingdom	The schooner collided with the barque Anetta (United Kingdom) and sank in the Firth of Clyde with the loss of her captain. Survivors were rescued by Anetta. Three Sisters was on a voyage from Ayr to Belfast, County Antrim.
Woodham	United Kingdom	The steamship sank off Lisbon, Portugal. Her crew were rescued.
Zelie	France	The schooner ran aground at Dysart, Fife, United Kingdom. She was on a voyage from Calais to Dysart.

== 16 December ==
List of shipwrecks: 16 December 1876
Ship	State	Description
Amalie	Norway	The barque ran aground on the Longsand, in the North Sea off the coast of Essex, United Kingdom. She was on a voyage from Aberdeen to Baltimore, Maryland, United States. She was refloated with assistance from the smack Aquiline (United Kingdom) and assisted in to Harwich, Essex in a leaky condition.
Augustine	Canada	The ship departed from Cape Breton Island, Nova Scotia for a British port. No further trace, reported missing.
Beecher Stowe	United Kingdom	The barque was driven ashore at Sutton-on-Sea, Lincolnshire. Her ten crew were rescued by the Sutton Lifeboat Caroline ( Royal National Lifeboat Institution). Beecher Stowe was on a voyage from Frederikstad, Denmark to London.
Deux Sœurs	France	The lugger was wrecked on Île Pelée, Manche. Her crew were rescued.
Gettysburg	United States	The fishing schooner was abandoned in the Atlantic Ocean. Her eleven crew were rescued by the steamship Frisia (Germany).
Gnome	United Kingdom	The steamship collided with the barque San Luis (United Kingdom) and sank off Cuxhaven, Germany with the loss of a crew member. Her passengers and the rest of her crew were rescued by San Luis. Gnome was on a voyage from Hamburg, Germany to Leith, Lothian.
Jenny Lind	United Kingdom	The schooner was driven ashore at Ballyferris Point, County Down. Her five crew were rescued by the Ballywalter Lifeboat Admiral Henry Meynell ( Royal National Lifeboat Institution). Jenny Lind was on a voyage from Maryport, Cumberland to Portrush, County Antrim.
J. P. Wheeler	United States	The ship was driven ashore at New York. She was on a voyage from London to New York. She was refloated in late December.
Pet	United Kingdom	The schooner was abandoned at Padstow, Cornwall. Her crew were rescued. She was on a voyage from Ipswich, Suffolk to Padstow. She was later taken in to Padstow.
Sainte Marthe	France	The sloop was driven ashore at Blyth, Northumberland, United Kingdom.
Silvia	United Kingdom	The ship was blown out to sea from Tignish, Prince Edward Island. No further trace, reported missing.
Thetis	(Dominion of Newfoundland) Newfoundland Colony	The ship departed from Saint John's for Queenstown, County Cork, United Kingdom. No further trace, reported missing.
Times	United Kingdom	The steamship ran aground on the Beacon Rock. She was on a voyage from Rotterdam, South Holland, Netherlands to Dundee, Forfarshire. She was refloated and taken in to Dundee.
Unnamed	United Kingdom	The fishing boat was abandoned off Teignmouth, Devon. Her three crew were rescued by the Teignmouth Lifeboat Chian ( Royal National Lifeboat Institution).

== 17 December ==
List of shipwrecks: 17 December 1876
Ship	State	Description
Aberystwyth	United Kingdom	The steamship ran aground at Hubberston, Pembrokeshire. She was on a voyage from Newport, Monmouthshire to Dublin.
Ada H. Halls	Canada	The brigantine was wrecked on Long Cay. She was on a voyage from Puerto Caballo, Venezuela to New York, United States.
Ethel	United Kingdom	The ship collided with the barque Gœthe (Germany) and was abandoned 30 nautical miles (56 km) south by west of The Lizard, Cornwall. Her crew were rescued by Gœthe. Ethel was on a voyage from Cowes, Isle of Wight to Casablanca, Morocco.
Gabriel	Germany	The barque was wrecked at Langness, Isle of Man with the loss of three of her eleven crew. She was on a voyage from Birkenhead, Cheshire, United Kingdom to Memel.
J. P. Taylor	United Kingdom	The schooner ran aground at Wexford. She was on a voyage from New York to Wexford. She was refloated the next day.
L'Etoile de Redan	France	The lugger was run into by the steamship Potomac (United Kingdom) and sank in the Bristol Channel 6 nautical miles (11 km) off Nash Point, Glamorgan, United Kingdom with the loss of all but her captain. He was rescued by Potomac. L'Etoile de Redan was on a voyage from "Masquar" to Cardiff, Glamorgan.
Medusa	Flag unknown	The steamship was driven ashore at Sulina, Ottoman Empire. She was on a voyage from Constantinople to Sulina. She was refloated.
Shoreham	United Kingdom	The steamship collided with the derelict barque Dia Matrone (Russia) off the Haisborough Sands and was severely damaged at the bows. She was on a voyage from South Shields, County Durham to Shoreham-by-Sea, Sussex. She put in to Great Yarmouth, Norfolk.

== 18 December ==
List of shipwrecks: 18 December 1876
Ship	State	Description
Aarvak	Norway	The brig was wrecked on the Greenhill Rock, in Budle Bay. Her six crew were rescued by rocket apparatus. She was on a voyage from Leith, Lothian, United Kingdom to Helsingør, Denmark.
Ignazio	Italy	The ship was wrecked on the Colorados, off the coast of Cuba. She was on a voyage from New Orleans, Louisiana, United States to Dunkirk, Nord, France.
Pilgrim	United Kingdom	The brig caught fire and sank off Grimsby, Lincolnshire. Her crew were rescued. She was on a voyage from Sunderland, County Durham to Southampton, Hampshire.
Quang Se	China	The steamship was driven ashore at New York, United States. She was refloated with assistance on 22 December.
Resolution	United Kingdom	The schooner was driven ashore and wrecked in Cushendun Bay. She was on a voyage from Liverpool, Lancashire to Ramsey, Isle of Man.
Zenobe	United Kingdom	The ship was driven ashore and wrecked on "All Right Island", Nova Scotia, Canada. Her crew survived.
Castalia	United Kingdom	The ship was driven ashore in a snowstorm and wrecked on Marshall's Island, near Mount Desert Island, Maine. She left on 8 December on a voyage from Saint John, to New York City, carrying laths. All five crew perished, three bodies recovered. The wreck was identified from the registry number on her main beam.
Unnamed	United Kingdom	The steamship was driven ashore at "Ghanos", Ottoman Empire.
Two unnamed vessks	Flags unknown	The brig and the schooner ran aground on the Krantzand, in the North Sea.

== 19 December ==
List of shipwrecks: 19 December 1876
Ship	State	Description
Anchen	Germany	The schooner ran aground on the Elleboog Sand, in the North Sea off the coast of Zeeland, Netherlands.
Banner	United Kingdom	The ship ran aground on the Goodwin Sands, Kent. She was refloated and taken in tow for Hamburg, Germany.
Cerdic	United Kingdom	The ship was sighted off Malta whilst on a voyage from Galaţi, Ottoman Empire to Falmouth, Cornwall. Subsequently foundered with the loss of all 22 crew; wreckage from the ship, including the builder's plate, washed up on the Île de Sein, Finistère, France in February 1877.
Ellen Jones	United Kingdom	The ship was sighted off Læsø, Denmark whilst on a voyage from Danzig, Germany to Gloucester. No further trace, presumed foundered with the loss of all hands.
Excelsior	United Kingdom	The steamship was driven ashore on an island in the Sea of Marmara. She was on a voyage from Sulina, Ottoman Empire to Antwerp, Belgium.
Hringhorn	Norway	The derelict brig was driven ashore at the mouth of the River Ythan.
Iceland	United Kingdom	The steamship was driven ashore on Texel, North Holland, Netherlands. Her crew of more than 30 people were rescued. She was on a voyage from Liverpool, Lancashire to Hamburg.
Marie Lorentzen	United Kingdom	The steamship was wrecked at Cape Finisterre, Spain. Her crew were rescued by Langshaw (United Kingdom). Marie Lorentzen was on a voyage from Penarth, Glamorgan to Port Said, Egypt.
Rose	United Kingdom	The schooner was driven ashore at Sanlúcar de Barrameda, Spain. Her crew were rescued. She was on a voyage from Falmouth, Cornwall to Seville, Spain.
Sylvia	Canada	The barque was abandoned off Entry Island, Nova Scotia. Her twelve crew survived.
Unnamed	United Kingdom	The steamship was driven ashore at "Ghanos", Ottoman Empire.

== 20 December ==
List of shipwrecks: 20 December 1876
Ship	State	Description
Annie	United Kingdom	The schooner was driven ashore and wrecked near Kinbrace, Sutherland.
Costa Rica	Norway	The barque was driven ashore and wrecked at Amble, Northumberland United Kingdom. Her crew were rescued by rocket apparatus. She was on a voyage from Sandefjord to Inverness, United Kingdom.
Elizabeth Kilner	United Kingdom	The schooner was driven ashore at Southwold, Suffolk. She was on a voyage from Antwerp, Belgium to Goole, Yorkshire.
Frigga	Norway	The ship was driven ashore and wrecked at Dunbar, Lothian, United Kingdom. Her crew were rescued. She was on a voyage from Berwick upon Tweed, Northumberland to Brevig.
George	United Kingdom	The schooner was driven ashore and wrecked at Sandy Point, in the Larne Lough. Her crew were rescued. She was on a voyage from Maryport, Cumberland to Drogheda, County Louth.
Jemima	United Kingdom	The smack was driven ashore and wrecked at Hurst Castle, Hampshire. Her crew survived.
Lady Montefiore	United Kingdom	The fishing smack was driven ashore at Thorpeness, Suffolk. Her crew were rescued.
Maack	Germany	The brig was wrecked on the Morup Reef, in the Baltic Sea. She was on a voyage from Liverpool, Lancashire, United Kingdom to Flensburg.
Margrethe	Norway	The ship was driven ashore and wrecked at Yenslie Head, Orkney Islands, United Kingdom. Her eight crew survived.
Robin	United Kingdom	The schooner ran aground at Præstø, Denmark. She was on a voyage from Danzig, Germany to Bordeaux, Gironde, France. She was refloated but ran aground on the Kalkbranderel.
Three Brothers	United Kingdom	The smack was driven ashore and wrecked at Hurst Castle. Her crew survived.
Velocity	United Kingdom	The steamship ran into the steamship Halley (United Kingdom) and sank in the River Thames. Velocity was on a voyage from London to Calais, France. She was scrapped in 1877.
Vennerne	Norway	The brig was abandoned off Aberdeen, United Kingdom with the loss of four of her crew. Survivors were rescued by the steamship London (United Kingdom). Vennerne was on a voyage from Berwick upon Tweed, Northumberland, United Kingdom to Brevig. She was driven ashore 12 nautical miles (22 km) north of Aberdeen.
Vigilant	United Kingdom	The brigantine was driven ashore and wrecked on Skokholm, Pembrokeshire. Her crew survived. She was on a voyage from Pembrey, Pembrokeshire to Waterford. She subsequently sank.

== 21 December ==
List of shipwrecks: 21 December 1876
Ship	State	Description
Aagot	Denmark	The schooner was driven ashore and damaged at Granton, Lothian, United Kingdom. She was on a voyage from Newcastle upon Tyne, Northumberland, United Kingdom to Tonsberg, Germany.
Albion	United Kingdom	The brigantine was driven ashore and wrecked at Tynemouth, Northumberland. Her six crew were rescued. She was on a voyage from Faversham, Kent to Tynemouth.
Alexander Cochrane	United Kingdom	The schooner was driven ashore at Fisherrow, Lothian. Her six crew survived. She was on a voyage from Morrison's Haven, Lothian to Southampton, Hampshire.
Annie Grant	United Kingdom	The schooner was driven ashore and wrecked at Safi, Morocco with the loss of a crew member.
Augusta	United Kingdom	The ship was wrecked on the Longscar Rocks, on the coast of Northumberland. Her crew were rescued by rocket apparatus.
Beaver	Canada	The brigantine foundered in the Atlantic Ocean. Her eight crew were rescued by the barque Mathilda (Sweden). Beaver was on a voyage from New York, United States to Queenstown, County Cork, United Kingdom.
Bellenden	United Kingdom	The schooner was driven ashore at Granton.
Betsey	United Kingdom	The fishing smack was driven ashore and wrecked at Granton.
Blenheim	United Kingdom	The steamship struck the pier at South Shields, County Durham and broke in two with the loss of a crew member.
Borella	United Kingdom	The ship sank in the North Sea 60 nautical miles (110 km) south east of the Farne Islands, Northumberland with the loss of all hands, according to a message in a bottle that washed up at Goswick, Northumberland in early January 1877.
Brothers	United Kingdom	The brigantine was driven ashore at Lamlash, Isle of Arran. She was refloated and taken in to Irvine, Ayrshire.
Cairo	United Kingdom	The barque was sighted whilst on a voyage from London for Melbourne, Victoria. Presumed subsequently foundered with the loss of all on board, 67–70 lives. Wreckage sighted in the South Atlantic in mid-January 1877 was thought to be from Cairo.
City of Seringapatam	United Kingdom	The ship was driven ashore and wrecked on Boa Vista Island, Cape Verde Islands. All on board were rescued. She was on a voyage from London to Melbourne, Victoria.
Christina	Norway	The schooner was driven ashore and wrecked at Newtonhill, Kincardineshire, United Kingdom with the loss of all hands.
Clara	Germany	The barque was abandoned in the Atlantic Ocean. Her crew were rescued by Lida (Germany). Clara was on a voyage from Philadelphia, Pennsylvania to Hamburg.
Claremont	United Kingdom	The steamship was driven ashore at South Shields, County Durham. All 23 people on board were rescued by rocket apparatus. She was on a voyage from Hull, Yorkshire to Newcastle upon Tyne. She was refloated on 4 January 1877.
Colombo	United Kingdom	The steamship was sighted in the Atlantic Ocean (47°26′N 35°53′W) by the steamship America (Germany) whilst on a voyage from Hull, Yorkshire for New York, United States. No further trace, presumed foundered with the loss of all on board.
Cumberland	United Kingdom	The brigantine was driven ashore and wrecked at Lamlash. Her crew were rescued.
Emil	Sweden	The brigantine was driven ashore and wrecked at Scoughall, Lothian with the loss of a crew member.
Excelsior	United Kingdom	The barque was driven ashore and wrecked at Seaham, County Durham. Her eleven crew were rescued by the Seaham Lifeboat Sisters Carter of Harrogate ( Royal National Lifeboat Institution).
Fenella	United Kingdom	The steamship was driven ashore at South Shields. Her crew were rescued. She was on a voyage from London to South Shields. She was later refloated.
First of May	United Kingdom	The brig was driven ashore and wrecked at Tynemouth, Northumberland. Her eight crew were rescued by the Tynemouth Lifeboat. She was on a voyage from London to South Shields.
Gem of the Nith	United Kingdom	The barque was driven ashore near Newbiggin-by-the-Sea, Northumberland with the probable loss of all hands, at least eight lives. She was on a voyage from Danzig, Germany to London. a
Halley	United Kingdom	The steamship departed from Gibraltar for North Shields, Northumberland. No further trace, reported missing.
Heron	United Kingdom	The schooner was driven ashore at Gibraltar.
Hirondelle	France	The schooner was driven ashore and wrecked 3 nautical miles (5.6 km) north of Seaham, County Durham. Her crew were rescued. She was on a voyage from Calais to Warkworth, Northumberland.
Hunter	United Kingdom	The schooner was driven ashore and wrecked at Scrabster, Caithness. She was on a voyage from Thurso, Caithness to South Shields.
Johan	Norway	The ship was driven ashore and wrecked at Muchalls, Kincardineshire, United Kingdom. Her ten crew were rescued by the Coastguard.
Johanna	Germany	The brig was driven ashore and wrecked at Darserort, Russia with the loss of all hands, at least seven lives. She was on a voyage from Danzig to Newcastle upon Tyne.
John Liddle	United Kingdom	The steamship ran aground on the Potato Garth, in the River Tyne, and sank. She was on a voyage from London to Sunderland, County Durham.
Lauriana	United Kingdom	The smack was driven ashore and sank at "Kiloe", Somerset.
Lydda	United Kingdom	The ship was wrecked near Bamborough, Northumberland with the loss of all hands.
Magnetic	United Kingdom	The steamship was driven ashore 5 nautical miles (9.3 km) north of Culmore, County Londonderry. She was on a voyage from Liverpool, Lancashire to Londonderry.
Maria C. Gardella	Italy	The ship foundered in the North Sea 4 nautical miles (7.4 km) west of St Abbs Head, Berwickshire, United Kingdom with the loss to twelve of the thirteen people on board. She was on a voyage from Dordrecht, South Holland to Newcastle upon Tyne.
Mentoro Secondo	Portugal	The schooner was abandoned in the Atlantic Ocean. Her crew were rescued by the barque Hoffnung (Germany). Mentoro Secondo was on a voyage from Porto to New York.
Minnie	Norway	The schooner was driven ashore and severely damaged at Leith.
New Cornwall	United Kingdom	The schooner foundered off the mouth of the River Tyne with the loss of all nineteen crew.
Niord	Norway	The steamship collided with the steamship Glencoe (United Kingdom) and then ran aground at Granton. She was severely damaged.
Peter	Denmark	The ship was driven ashore and wrecked at Granton. She was on a voyage from East Wemyss, Fife, United Kingdom to Sundsvall, Sweden.
Peter	Germany	The schooner was wrecked south of Montrose, Forfarshire, United Kingdom with the loss of all but one of her crew. She was on a voyage from Sunderland to Kiel.
Regina	(United Kingdom of Great Britain and Ireland) Jersey	The schooner foundered in the North Sea off the coast of Northumberland with the loss of all hands.
Rose	France	The ship was lost near Linares.
San Domingo	United Kingdom	The steamship was driven ashore at the Icremerston Lime Kilns, 5 nautical miles (9.3 km) south of Berwick upon Tweed, Northumberland.
Syren	United Kingdom	The brigantine was driven ashore and wrecked at Lamlash. Her crew were rescued by the Coastguard.
Titania	United Kingdom	The brig was driven ashore and damaged at Granton.
Torpid	United Kingdom	The yacht was driven ashore at Port Bannatyne, Isle of Bute.
Tougya	United Kingdom	The barque was driven ashore at Dunbar, Lothian. Her crew were rescued. She was on a voyage from Berwick upon Tweed, Northumberland to Norway.
Tyne	United Kingdom	The steamship was driven ashore and wrecked at South Shields with the loss of all seventeen crew. She was on a voyage from London to North Shields, Northumberland.
Union	United Kingdom	The barque was driven ashore at Donibristle House, Fife. She was on a voyage from Alloa, Clackmannanshire to Plymouth, Devon.
United	United Kingdom	The sloop was driven ashore and damaged at Granton. She was on a voyage from Falmouth, Cornwall to Montrose, Forfarshire.
Wells	United Kingdom	The steamship foundered in the North Sea with the loss of all 21 crew, according to a message in a bottle that washed up near Lybster, Caithness on 13 January 1877. She was on a voyage from Memel, Germany to Hull.
Wifsta Warf	Sweden	The barque was driven into Pansy (United Kingdom) at Granton and was severely damaged.
Two unnamed vessels	United Kingdom	A schooner and a yacht were driven ashore at Port Bannatyne.
Unnamed	Flag unknown	The schooner foundered in the North Sea 60 nautical miles (110 km) south east of the Farne Islands with the loss of all hands. Witnessed by Borella (United Kingdom).

== 22 December ==
List of shipwrecks: 22 December 1876
Ship	State	Description
Alida	Germany	The barque was wrecked at St Combs, Aberdeenshire, United Kingdom with the loss of all hands.
Amelia	France	The schooner was driven ashore on Stronsay, Orkney Islands, United Kingdom. She was on a voyage from Tromsø, Norway to Gothenburg, Sweden. She was refloated with assistance from the tug Admiral (United Kingdom).
Anna	Russia	The schooner was wrecked in Buckaskil Bay, Sanday, Orkney Islands. Her crew were rescued.
Bai	Norway	The schooner was driven ashore at Crail, Fife, United Kingdom. Her crew were rescued by rocket apparatus.
Bayard	Norway	The barque was wrecked at Elseness, Sanday with the loss of nine of her ten crew. She was on a voyage from Grangemouth, Stirlingshire, United Kingdom to Tønsberg.
Beatrice	Denmark	The schooner was driven ashore on Nexø. She was on a voyage from Liepāja, Russia to London, United Kingdom. She subsequently became a wreck.
Christine	Norway	The brig was driven ashore and wrecked at the mouth of the River Don with the loss of all nine crew. She was on a voyage from Gloucester, United Kingdom to Horten.
Columbus	Germany	The brig was wrecked at Trusness, Sanday with the loss of three of her eight crew. She was on a voyage from Kronstadt, Russia to Grangemouth.
Dgode Vrede	Norway	The barque was driven ashore and wrecked 4 nautical miles (7.4 km) north of Aberdeen, United Kingdom with the loss of four of her crew.
Eliza	United Kingdom	The sloop was driven ashore at Benacre, Suffolk. She was refloated with assistance from the Kessingland Lifeboat and taken in to Lowestoft, Suffolk.
Enighed	Norway	The brig was wrecked near Aberdeen with the loss of one of her eight crew.
Frithy	Norway	The brig was wrecked on Burray, Orkney Islands with the loss of eight of the nine people on board.
Firm	United Kingdom	The sloop was driven ashore at Benacre. She was refloated with the assistance of the Kessingland Lifeboat and assisted in to Lowestoft.
Foldin	Norway	The barque was driven at Stonehaven, Aberdeenshire. Her crew were rescued.
Frethyod	United Kingdom	The brig was wrecked on Burry with the loss of all but one of her crew. She was on a voyage from Tønsberg to Honfleur, Manche, France.
George Wascoe	United Kingdom	The ship was driven ashore at Dunkirk, Nord, France. She was on a voyage from Odesa, Russia to Dunkirk. She was refloated with assistance on 27 December.
Helen Burns	United Kingdom	The schooner was run into by the gunboat HMS Tees (Royal Navy) at South Shields, County Durham and was severely damaged.
Helmine	Germany	The schooner was driven ashore at Cuxhaven. She was on a voyage from Harburg to London.
Holmestrand	Norway	The barque was driven ashore west of Domesnes, Russia. Her crew were rescued. She was on a voyage from Copenhagen, Denmark to Riga, Russia.
Johanna	Germany	The barque was driven ashore and wrecked at Garron Point, near Stonehaven, Aberdeenshire with the loss of all fourteen crew.
Johanna	Norway	The brig was wrecked on the Cowie Rocks, near Stonehaven. Her ten crew were rescued by rocket apparatus. She was on a voyage from Great Grimsby, Lincolnshire, United Kingdom to Tvedestrand, Norway.
Leonie	United Kingdom	The brigantine was driven ashore at Culdaff, County Donegal. She was on a voyage from Londonderry to Newcastle upon Tyne, Northumberland. She was refloated on 31 December and towed in to Londonderry by the tug Admiral (United Kingdom). Subsequently placed under repair.
Louis	Germany	The schooner was wrecked on Stronsay. Her crew were rescued. She was on a voyage from Grangemouth to Griefswald.
Maranhense	Brazil	The ship was driven ashore at Maranhão. She was refloated and then collided with the steamships Bahia and Maranhão (both Brazil).
Marie	Germany	The barque was wrecked at Craster, Northumberland. Her eight crew were rescued by rocket apparatus. She was on a voyage from St. Davids to Memel.
Marie Alexandre	France	The barque was abandoned in the Atlantic Ocean. Her eleven crew were rescued by the steamship H. D. Ponchin (United Kingdom). Marie Alexandre was on a voyage from Newcastle upon Tyne to Martinique.
Nebo	Norway	The brig was driven ashore and wrecked near Crail, Fife, United Kingdom. Her crew were rescued.
Oberfoster Uffeln	Germany	The brig was driven ashore at Montrose, Forfarshire with the loss of six of her eight crew. She was on a voyage from Newcastle upon Tyne to Rostock.
Palmetta	Flag unknown	The barque was wrecked 7 nautical miles (13 km) south of Peterhead, Aberdeenshire with the loss of all hands.
Penelope	Norway	The ship was wrecked at Gourdon, Aberdeenshire, United Kingdom. Her ten crew were rescued by rocket apparatus. She was on a voyage from London, United Kingdom to Drammen.
Rosa	Russia	The barque was run ashore at Longhope, Orkney Islands. She was on a voyage from Liverpool, Lancashire to a Baltic port.
Salon	Norway	The barque was driven ashore on Sanday. Her crew survived. She was on a voyage from the Nieuwe Diep to Tønsberg.
Sophie	Norway	The brig was wrecked at Peterhead with the loss of all hands.
William	Norway	The brig was driven ashore and wrecked at Belhelvie, Aberdeenshire with the loss of all eight of her crew.
Unnamed	Germany	The barque was wrecked at Lossiemouth, Moray, United Kingdom with the loss of all hands, twelve to fifteen lives.
Unnamed	Flag unknown	The ship was driven ashore at Rattray Head. Her seven crew were rescued by rocket apparatus.
Unnamed	Netherlands	The galiot was driven ashore at St Combs. Her four crew were rescued by fishing boats.
Unnamed	Norway	The schooner was wrecked on Stronsay. Her crew were rescued.

== 23 December ==
List of shipwrecks: 23 December 1876
Ship	State	Description
Adler	Germany	The ship was wrecked. Her crew were rescued. She was on a voyage from Trondheim, Norway to the Firth of Forth.
Alardic	Norway	The barque was wrecked at Scotstoun Head, Aberdeenshire, United Kingdom. Her twelve crew were rescued. She was on a voyage from Dundee, Forfarshire to Drammen
Angela	Norway	The brig was driven ashore at Rattray Head, Aberdeenshire. Her seven crew were rescued by the Coastguard using rocket apparatus. She was on a voyage from Grimsby, Lincolnshire, United Kingdom to Drammen.
Au Revoir	Russia	The barque was driven ashore at Keills near Wick, Caithness, United Kingdom. Her crew were rescued. She was on a voyage from Havre de Grâce, Seine-Inférieure, France to Riga.
Bellalie	France	The schooner was abandoned off Montrose, Forfarshire. Her six crew were rescued by the Montrose Lifeboat Mincing Lane ( Royal National Lifeboat Institution). Bellalie was on a voyage from Dunkirk, Nord to the River Tyne. She subsequently drove ashore and was wrecked.
Courier	Russia	The brig was wrecked near Wick with the loss of eight of her crew.
Dhoolia	United Kingdom	The steamship foundered between Cape Finisterre and Cape Ortegal, Spain. Her 43 crew were rescued by the steamship Malta (United Kingdom). Dhoolia was on a voyage from Alexandria, Egypt to Hull, Yorkshire.
Doctor	United Kingdom	The ship was driven ashore at Villareal, Spain.
Eliza	United Kingdom	The ship ran aground on the Barnard Sand, in the North Sea off the coast of Suffolk. She was refloated and taken in to Lowestoft, Suffolk.
Emilie	Germany	The brig ran aground on the Gaa Sands, off the mouth of the River Tay and was wrecked with the loss of six of her seven crew and four rescuers. She was on a voyage from Sunderland, County Durham, United Kingdom to Wolgast.
Emslie	Flag unknown	The schooner was driven ashore near Wick.
Halley	United Kingdom	The steamship was sighted off Gibraltar whilst on a voyage from Odesa, Russia to Falmouth, Cornwall. No further trace, presumed foundered with the loss of all 26 crew.
Ingleborough	United Kingdom	The barque ran aground on the Caister Shoal, in the North Sea off the coast of Norfolk. Her thirteen crew were rescued by the Caister Lifeboat. She was on a voyage from Hull, Yorkshire to Garrucha, Spain.
Johanne	Denmark	The brig was driven ashore at Belhelvie, Aberdeenshire, United Kingdom. Her seven crew were rescued. She was on a voyage from Grangemouth, Stirlingshire, United Kingdom to a Danish port.
Neapel	Germany	The steamship ran aground on the Pagensand, in the North Sea off the German coast. She was later refloated.
Oberposter Uffeln	Germany	The brig was driven ashore and wrecked 2.5 nautical miles (4.6 km) from Montrose with the loss of six of her eight crew. She was on a voyage from Newcastle upon Tyne, Northumberland, United Kingdom to Rostock.
Pallmatta	Flag unknown	The barque was wrecked on the Sears of Cruden, Aberdeenshire with the loss of all hands.
Sophia	Norway	The ship was driven ashore at Peterhead, Aberdeenshire.
Twee Gezusters	Netherlands	The ship was driven ashore near Thisted, Denmark. She was refloated on 29 April 1877.
Tyseina	Norway	The schooner was driven ashore at Charleston, Forfarshire. Her crew were rescued. She was on a voyage from Bergen to Amsterdam, North Holland, Netherlands.
Victoria	Norway	The barque was abandoned in the North Sea off St. Abb's Head, Berwickshire, United Kingdom. Her crew were rescued by the steamship Forth (United Kingdom). Victoria was on a voyage from the Nieuw Dipe to Drammen.
Vises	Norway	The brig was driven ashore at Belhelvie. Her five crew survived. She was on a voyage from Grangemouth to Kristiansand.
Unnamed	Flag unknown	The brig was driver ashore and wrecked at Stralathen, Kincardineshire, United Kingdom with the loss of all hands.
Unnamed	Netherlands	The schooner was driven ashore at Rattray Head. Her crew were rescued by a fishing boat.

== 24 December ==
List of shipwrecks: 24 December 1876
Ship	State	Description
Dominion	United Kingdom	The steamship ran aground on Taylor's Bank, in Liverpool Bay. She was on a voyage from Liverpool, Lancashire to Halifax, Nova Scotia, Canada and Philadelphia, Pennsylvania United States. She was refloated and resumed her voyage.
Energine	Germany	The barque was driven ashore at Scrabster, Caithness, United Kingdom. Her crew were rescued. She was on a voyage from London to Memel.
Evangelistria	Greece	The ship was wrecked at Alexandroupoli.
Herman Sauber	Germany	The steamship was driven ashore in the River Tyne. Her nineteen crew were rescued by the South Shields Lifeboat Willie Wouldhave ( Royal National Lifeboat Institution). Herman Loaber was on a voyage from Hamburg to Sunderland, County Durham, United Kingdom. she was later refloated.
Klintenborg	Denmark	The galleon was abandoned in the North Sea. Her crew were rescued. She was on a voyage from Middlesbrough, Yorkshire, United Kingdom to Denmark. Klintenborg was towed in to Leith, Lothian, United Kingdom by the tug Fiery Cross on 26 December.
Norma	Norway	The barque was abandoned between the Orkney Islands and the Shetland Islands, United Kingdom. Her crew were rescued by Hermione (Norway). Norma was on a voyage from Sunderland to Kristiansand.
Paul Frederick	Germany	The derelict brig was discovered in the North Sea 8 nautical miles (15 km) off St. Abb's Head, Berwickshire, United Kingdom by the steamship Gwendoline (United Kingdom), which towed her in to the River Tees.
Sampson	United Kingdom	The schooner was driven ashore and wrecked at Usan, near Montrose, Forfarshire with the loss of all six crew. She was on a voyage from Sittingbourne, Kent to South Shields, County Durham.
Unition	(United Kingdom of Great Britain and Ireland) Guernsey	The brig was driven ashore and wrecked at Boulmer, Northumberland, United Kingdom with the loss of one of her eight crew. Three survivors were rescued by the Alnmouth Lifeboat and four by rocket apparatus. She was on a voyage from London to Burntisland, Fife.
Unnamed	Flag unknown	The schooner was driven ashore and wrecked in Sinclairs Bay. Three of her seven crew were rescued by a coble, but were lost when the coble capsized. Three were lost on the wreck and one swam ashore.
Unnamed	United Kingdom	The coble capsized with the loss of seven of the twelve people on board. She was returning to Wick, Caithness having gone to the aid of a schooner in distress.

== 25 December ==
List of shipwrecks: 25 December 1876
Ship	State	Description
Ambassador	United Kingdom	The steamship collided with George F. Munson (United States) and sank off Vingoria, India with the loss of twelve or 22 of the 68 people on board. Ambassador was on a voyage from Calcutta to Bombay.
Courier	United Kingdom	The ship was abandoned in the Atlantic Ocean (41°00′N 29°20′W). Her crew were rescued by Jacob Rust (Germany). Courier was on a voyage from Charleston, South Carolina. United States to Newport, Monmouthshire.
Cybele	United Kingdom	The steamship ran aground on the Goodwin Sands, Kent. She was refloated with the assistance of the tug Benachia (United Kingdom), another tug and the Ramsgate Lifeboat. She was taken into The Downs.
Gem	United Kingdom	The schooner was driven ashore at Aberdeen. She was refloated with assistance from the tug Britannia (United Kingdom). Gem was on a voyage from a Baltic port to London.
Ingleborough	United Kingdom	The barque was wrecked on the Caister Shoal, in the North Sea off the coast of Norfolk. Her thirteen crew were rescued by the Caister Lifeboat. She was on a voyage from Newcastle upon Tyne, Northumberland to a Spanish port. She subsequently floated off and came ashore at Horsey, Norfolk.
Lydia	Norway	The derelict schooner was towed in to the River Tay by the tug Anglia (United Kingdom). All four crew presumed lost at sea.
Marys	United Kingdom	The brig was driven onto by Herd Sand, in the North Sea off the coast of County Durham by a freshet. Her six crew were rescued by the South Shields Lifeboat Northumberland ( Royal National Lifeboat Institution). Marys was on a voyage from Dieppe, Seine-Inférieure to Newcastle upon Tyne. She was later refloated.
Roskva	Denmark	The brig was abandoned in the North Sea. Her seven crew were rescued by the brig Melivia (France). Roskva was on a voyage from Newcastle upon Tyne to "Greenain". She came ashore at Cunningsburgh, Shetland Islands, United Kingdom and was wrecked.
Sea Belle	United Kingdom	The paddle tug sank at North Shields, Northumberland. Subsequently refloated, repaired and returned to service.
St. Elwine	United Kingdom	The schooner was driven ashore 3 nautical miles (5.6 km) north of Winterton-on-Sea, Norfolk. Her six crew were rescued by the Winterton Lifeboat Anna Maria ( Royal National Lifeboat Institution). St. Elwine was on a voyage from Hamburg, Germany to Cardiff, Glamorgan.
Zephyr	United Kingdom	The schooner was wrecked on the Longsand, in the North Sea off the coast of Essex with the loss of six of her eight crew. Survivors were rescued by the smack Concord (United Kingdom). Zephyr was on a voyage from Cardiff, Glamorgan to Hamburg. She was refloated on 29 December and taken in to Harwich, Essex, where she was broken up.
Unnamed	United Kingdom	The barque was driven ashore and wrecked at Golspie, Sutherland, United Kingdom.

== 26 December ==
List of shipwrecks: 26 December 1876
Ship	State	Description
Andre	Austria-Hungary	The brig was wrecked west of Lamorna, Cornwall, United Kingdom. Her eleven crew survived. She was on a voyage from Newport, Monmouthshire, United Kingdom to Taranto, Italy.
Emilie	Germany	The schooner was driven ashore and wrecked at Golspie, Sutherland or Wick, Caithness, United Kingdom with the loss of six of her seven crew. Four people also died whilst attempting to rescue her crew.
Eos	Norway	The barque was driven ashore and severely damaged at Berwick upon Tweed, Northumberland, United Kingdom. She broke up on 2 January 1877.
Eulalie	France	The ship was abandoned off Montrose, Forfarshire, United Kingdom. Her crew were rescued by the Montrose Lifeboat.
Grace Darling	United Kingdom	The fishing smack ran aground on the Stoney Binks, off the mouth of the Humber. Her crew were rescued by the Trinity House lifeboat from Spurn Point, Yorkshire.
James Coffill	United States	The ship was abandoned in the Atlantic Ocean. Her crew were rescued by Augusta (United Kingdom). James Coffill was on a voyage from New York, United States to A Coruña, Spain.
Lightsome	United Kingdom	The ship departed from Liverpool, Lancashire for Dublin. No further trace, presumed foundered with the loss of all hands.
Lilian	Tasmania	The schooner foundered 16 nautical miles (30 km) north of the Sydney Heads, New South Wales. All on board were rescued.
Margaritta	United Kingdom	The schooner was driven ashore in Dundrum Bay. Her crew were rescued by the Newcastle Lifeboat. She was on a voyage from Swansea, Glamorgan to Newark, New Jersey, United States.
Rjukan	Norway	During a voyage from London to New York City, the 960-ton sailing ship was wrecked during a gale about 200 feet (61 m) offshore at Bradley Beach, New Jersey. Her entire crew of twenty survived. She broke up later in the day, and her wreck sank in 25 feet (8 m) of water.
Talisman	United Kingdom	The ship was abandoned in the Atlantic Ocean (44°26′N 10°20′W). Her 22 crew were rescued by Juanita (Flag unknown). Talisman was on a voyage from Liverpool to Calcutta, India.

== 27 December ==
List of shipwrecks: 27 December 1876
Ship	State	Description
Arra	Denmark	The schooner was driven ashore north of Montrose, Forfarshire, United Kingdom.
Baltic	United Kingdom	The steamship was driven ashore near Westervik, Sweden. Her crew were rescued. She was on a voyage from Granton, Lothian to Gothenburg, Sweden. Baltic was refloated in early January 1877 and taken in to "Aaslum".
Battistina C.	Italy	The ship ran aground on the Warden Ledge, off the Isle of Wight, United Kingdom and was abandoned by her crew. She was on a voyage from Philadelphia, Pennsylvania, United States to Berwick upon Tweed, Northumberland.
Bertha	Germany	The ship ran aground on the Nutterplatte, in the North Sea. She was on a voyage from Bremen to West Wemyss, Fife, United Kingdom.
George Green	United States	The ship sank off Dartmouth, Devon, United Kingdom with the loss of all 24 crew.
Goethe	Germany	The passenger ship was wrecked on the Isla de Lobos, Uruguay with the loss of one life. She was on a voyage from Hamburg to Montevideo, Uruguay.
Harvey Mills	United States	The ship was destroyed by fire at Port Royal, South Carolina with the loss of several lives . She was on a voyage from Port Royal to Liverpool, Lancashire, United Kingdom.
Hiram	United Kingdom	The barque was wrecked on the north point of Jutland, Denmark with the loss of all hands.
Home	United Kingdom	The ship was holed by ice and wrecked at Falsterbo, Sweden. She was on a voyage from Memel, Germany to London.
Juanita	France	The barque was driven ashore and caught fire at Robin Hoods Bay, Yorkshire, United Kingdom with the loss of a crew member. She was on a voyage from Antwerp, Belgium to Hartlepool, County Durham, United Kingdom. She burnt out and was a total loss.
Marquez de Pombal	Portugal	The ship was wrecked at Pernambuco, Brazil.
Messenger	United Kingdom	The brig was driven ashore at Blyth, Northumberland. Her eight crew were rescued by rocket apparatus. She was on a voyage from Honfleur, Manche, France to Blyth.

== 28 December ==
List of shipwrecks: 28 December 1876
Ship	State	Description
Alice	United Kingdom	The ship was wrecked at Helman Head, Caithness.
Brise Lames	France	The brig was driven ashore at the mouth of the River Usk. She was on a voyage from Saint-Nazaire, Loire-Inférieure to Newport, Monmouthshire, United Kingdom.
Britannia	United Kingdom	The schooner departed from Leven, Fife for Gravelines, Nord, France. Subsequently foundered off the coast of Northumberland with the loss of all hands. Wreckage from the ship washed up at Goswick, Northumberland in early January 1877.
Cairo	United Kingdom	The ship was sighted in the South Atlantic whilst on a voyage from London to Melbourne, Victoria. No further trace, reported missing.
Countess of Zetland	United Kingdom	The brig struck a sunken wreck and was run ashore at Great Yarmouth, Norfolk. Her crew were rescued by the Great Yarmouth Lifeboat. She was on a voyage from the River Tyne to London.
Franconia	Germany	The steamship ran aground in the Elbe at "Colmaren". She was on a voyage from Curaçao, Curaçao and Dependencies to Cuxhaven.
Neva	(Russian Empire) Grand Duchy of Finland	The brig was driven ashore in the Rabbit Islands, Sutherland, United Kingdom. Her eight crew were rescued.
St. Olaf	Norway	The brig was abandoned off Aberdeen, United Kingdom. Her twelve crew were rescued by the fishing vessel Nigverheid (Netherlands). St. Olaf was on a voyage from London to Sandefjord.
Tinto	United Kingdom	The barque was driven ashore and wrecked at Cape Hatteras, North Carolina, United States. Her crew were rescued. She was on a voyage from Ardrossan, Ayrshire to Baltimore, Maryland, United States.

== 29 December ==
List of shipwrecks: 29 December 1876
Ship	State	Description
Bessemer	United Kingdom	The steamship ran aground on the Burcom Sand, in the Humber upstream of Grimsby, Lincolnshire. She was refloated and taken in to Hull, Yorkshire.
Celine	France	The brigantine was driven ashore and wrecked at Par, Cornwall, United Kingdom. Her six crew were rescued. She was on a voyage from Cardiff, Glamorgan, United Kingdom to the Charente.
Dacca	United Kingdom	The steamship was driven ashore and wrecked near the Singifilly Rock, on the Coromandel Coast north east of Bimlipatam, India. She was on a voyage from Cocanada to Madras.
Essex	United Kingdom	The steamship ran aground off Dragør, Denmark. She was on avoyage from Pillau, Germany to London. She was refloated with assistance.
Guiseppe Maggio	Italy	The ship was abandoned off the coast of Cornwall, United Kingdom. She drove ashore and was wrecked at Port Gaverne. She was on a voyage from South Shields, County Durham, United Kingdom to Genoa.
Hovding	Norway	The ship was driven ashore in the River Thames at Gravesend, Kent, United Kingdom.
Larry Bane	United Kingdom	The steamship ran aground at Ballycastle, County Antrim. She was refloated and put back to Ballycastle in a leaky condition.
Zeonie	United Kingdom	The ship was driven ashore at Culdaff, County Donegal.
Unnamed	Flag unknown	The brig foundered in the Bristol Channel off Lundy Island, Devon. Witnessed by the steamship Motalo (Sweden).
Unnamed	United Kingdom	The Thames barge was driven into a steamship and sank in the River Thames at Rotherhithe, Kent with the loss of two lives.

== 30 December ==
List of shipwrecks: 30 December 1876
Ship	State	Description
Princess Louise	United Kingdom	The ship was scuttled in Bangor Bay. She was on a voyage from Glasgow, Renfrewshire to Cork.
Solus	United Kingdom	The ship foundered off the mouth of the River Ythan.

== 31 December ==
List of shipwrecks: 31 December 1876
Ship	State	Description
Bay	Norway	The schooner foundered off Inchcape, Fife, United Kingdom with the loss of all hands, according to a message in a bottle that washed up at Fifeness, Fife in late February 1877.
Gnova	United Kingdom	The steamship struck the pier and sank at Calais, France. She was on a voyage from Middlesbrough, Yorkshire to Calais.
Inga	Norway	The ship departed from New York, United States for London, United Kingdom. No further trace, posted missing.

== Unknown date ==
List of shipwrecks: Unknown date in December 1876
Ship	State	Description
Aarvak	Norway	The barque was abandoned at sea. Her crew were rescued. She was on a voyage from Charlestown, Cornwall, United Kingdom to Aarhus, Denmark.
Actos	Russia	The barque caught fire at Pola, Austria-Hungary and was scuttled. She was reported to be on a voyage from Marseille, Bouches-du-Rhône to Tunis, Beylik of Tunis.
Advance	United Kingdom	The fishing smack foundered in the North Sea with the loss of all five crew.
America P.	United States	The ship was wrecked at Cape Hatteras, North Carolina. Her crew were rescued.
Amsterdam	United Kingdom	The barque was wrecked near Lunenburg, Nova Scotia, Canada. Her crew were rescued.
Assar-i Nasret	Ottoman Navy	The frigate was wrecked on Antipaxos, Greece. All 212 people on board were rescued by Nauplia ( Royal Hellenic Navy).
Bayswater	United Kingdom	The ship was abandoned at sea. Her nineteen crew were rescued by Tiber (United Kingdom).
Bernard and Agnes	Germany	The ship foundered in the North Sea off the coast of Aberdeenshire, United Kingdom.
Brittany	United Kingdom	The steamship foundered off the coast of Finistère, France.
California	United Kingdom	The steamship ran aground at New York, United States. She was refloated and resumed her voyage.
Carl Custal	Russia	The brig capsized at Baltimore, Maryland, United States.
Cedric	United Kingdom	The steamship departed from Odesa, Russia in early December for Falmouth, Cornwall. No further trace, presumed foundered with the loss of all 26 crew.
Ceres	United Kingdom	The barque was abandoned in the Skaggerak. She was on a voyage from Pori, Grand Duchy of Finland to London.
Christine	United Kingdom	The ship was wrecked near Hals, Denmark. Her crew were rescued. She was on a voyage from Sunderland, County Durham to Aarhus, Denmark.
Clara	Germany	The barque was abandoned in the Atlantic Ocean before 22 December.
Columba	Denmark	The ship foundered. She was on a voyage from Mejillones, Chile to Copenhagen.
Colombo	United Kingdom	The steamship departed from New York for Hull. No further trace, presumed foundered with the loss of all hands, about 50 lives.
Copernicus	United Kingdom	The steamship was driven ashore at Pará, Brazil. She was refloated with assistance but then collided with the barque Cruzeiro (France) and was damaged. Copernicus resumed her voyage.
Dawn	United Kingdom	The schooner was wrecked at Seville, Spain. She was on a voyage from Seville to Liverpool, Lancashire.
Diadem	United Kingdom	The ship was destroyed by fire at sea. She was on a voyage from Calcutta, India to Rangoon, Burma.
Diana	United States	The ship was driven ashore at Wilmington, Delaware. She was on a voyage from Wilmington to Antwerp, Belgium.
Faxovile	Norway	The steamship was abandoned at sea. Her crew were rescued. She was on a voyage from Grangemouth, Stirlingshire, United Kingdom to Christiania.
Frederick II	Germany	The ship foundered off the coast of Aberdeenshire.
Genevra	Russia	The steamship was driven ashore. She was on a voyage from Bergen, Norway to a Baltick port. She was later refloated.
Georges	France	The schooner was abandoned 1 nautical mile (1.9 km) north east of Steper Point, Cornwall.
Gettysburg	United States	The fishing schooner was abandoned on the Grand Banks of Newfoundland. Her crew were rescued.
Great	United Kingdom	The smack collided with another vessel and foundered in the Silver Pits, in the North Sea. Her crew were rescued.
Halia	United Kingdom	The ship was driven ashore at Varde, Denmark. Her crew were rescued. She was on a voyage from Sunderland to Varde.
Halley	United Kingdom	The steamship departed from Odesa in early December for Falmouth. No further trace, presumed foundered with the loss of all 24 crew.
Heath Park	United Kingdom	The ship foundered in the Atlantic Ocean. Her crew were rescued. She was on a voyage from New York to London.
Heinrich	Germany	The schooner was driven ashore east of Carlingnose Point, Fife, United Kingdom.
Hosak	Norway	The ship was abandoned in the North Sea. Her crew were rescued. She was on a voyage from Hartlepool, County Durham, United Kingdom to Roskilde, Denmark.
Indefatigable	United Kingdom	The ship was driven ashore at Macedon Point, County Antrim. She was on a voyage from Belfast, County Antrim to Maryport, Cumberland.
John	Denmark	The brig was abandoned at sea. Her crew were rescued. She was on a voyage from Hartlepool to Stavanger, Norway.
John Goode	United States	The barque foundered at sea. She was on a voyage from Sydney, Nova Scotia, to Saint John, New Brunswick, Canada.
John Lawson	United Kingdom	The ship foundered off Fredrikshavn, Denmark.
John O'Scott	United Kingdom	The ship foundered off the coast of Aberdeenshire.
John Wesley	United Kingdom	The fishing smack capsized in the North Sea. Her five crew were rescued by the steamship Maria (Germany).
Joseph Nickerson	United States	The schooner was driven ashore at Shark Point, Liberia. The vessel was attacked and plundered by the local inhabitants. Her crew survived.
J. Walter Scammell	Canada	The barque was abandoned in the Atlantic Ocean. Her crew were rescued. She was on a voyage from New York to Queenstown. She was subsequently towed in to Saint-Pierre, Saint Pierre and Miquelon.
Karnak, and Lady Vere de Vere	Germany; United Kingdom	The steamship Karnak collided with Lady Vere de Vere at Buenos Aires, Argentina. Both vessels were severely damaged.
Kestrel	United Kingdom	The ship was driven ashore at Gibraltar. She was refloated with assistance and taken in to Gibraltar in a leaky condition.
Lidskjalf	Norway	The ship was driven ashore at Wilmington, Delaware. She was on a voyage from Wilmington to Glasgow, Renfrewshire, United Kingdom. She was refloated and resumed her voyage.
Loch Goil	United Kingdom	The ship was driven ashore in the Dry Tortugas. She was on a voyage from New Orleans, Louisiana, United States to Liverpool. She was refloated and found to be leaky.
Maggie A. Robertson	Canada	The ship was driven ashore at Hawkesbury Point, Nova Scotia.
Maria	United Kingdom	The barque foundered in the Atlantic Ocean before 14 December with the loss of all but one of her crew. She was on a voyage from Doboy, Georgia, United States to Belfast, County Antrim.
Marie Julie	Germany	The ship was wrecked at Lybster, Caithness, United Kingdom.
Mary	United States	The ship foundered in the Atlantic Ocean with the loss of all hands, at least nineteen lives. An attempt by the barque Madre Fagli (Italy) to rescued the crew was unsuccessful.
Mary Ann Jane	United Kingdom	The schooner was driven ashore near Blyth, Northumberland. Her four crew were rescued by rocket apparatus. She was on a voyage from London to the River Tyne.
Mary A. Ward	Flag unknown	The schooner was abandoned in the Atlantic Ocean before 15 December.
Mercator	Belgium	The barque was wrecked on the Isla de los Estados, Argentina with the loss of eight of her sixteen crew before 13 December. She was on a voyage from Antwerp to Valparaíso, Chile.
Minerva	Canada	The barque was driven ashore and wrecked at Port Hood, Nova Scotia.
Miranda	United Kingdom	The ship ran aground on the Kentish Knock. She was on a voyage from Leith, Lothian to Smyrna, Ottoman Empire. She was refloated and assisted in to Dover, Kent in a leaky condition.
Montana	United States	The steamship was destroyed by fire at sea. All on board were rescued. She was on a voyage from San Francisco, California to the "Colombo River". She was scrapped in 1877.
Moselle	United Kingdom	The barque was abandoned at sea. Her crew were rescued by Fanny Tucker (United States. Moselle was on a voyage from Prince Edward Island, Canada to Queenstown.
Moss	Norway	The ship was driven ashore at Falsterbo, Sweden. She was on a voyage from Ystad, Sweden to a Norwegian port. She was refloated and put in to Copenhagen, Denmark in a leaky condition.
Muxel	Flag unknown	The brig was driven ashore. She was refloated and taken in to Copenhagen, Denmark, where she arrived on 14 December.
Mysotis	United Kingdom	The ship ran aground at Calcutta. She was on a voyage from Calcutta to Mauritius. She was refloated and resumed her voyage.
HMS Narcissus	Royal Navy	The frigate was driven ashore at Shanghai, China. She was refloated with assistance from HMS Immortalité (Royal Navy).
Oriana	Canada	The brig was destroyed by fire at Miragoâne, Haiti.
Orpheus	United Kingdom	The ship foundered off the coast of Cornwall.
Pampera	United Kingdom	The ship was abandoned at sea. She was on a voyage from Pembroke Dock, Pembrokeshire to Sydney, Nova Scotia, Canada.
Pondicherry	France	The barque was wrecked on the Haaks Bank, in the North Sea off the coast of Zeeland, Netherlands with the loss of two lives. She was on a voyage from Pisagua, Chile to Hamburg, Germany.
Queen of the Isles	United Kingdom	The ship was driven ashore near Gibraltar. She was on a voyage from Smyrna to London. She was refloated.
Rose	Western Australia	The ship was wrecked in the South China Sea with the loss of her captain.
Ruth	United Kingdom	The ship was driven ashore at the mouth of the River Mersey. She was refloated and taken in to Liverpool.
Salacia	United Kingdom	The barque was driven ashore and wrecked in the Wood Islands, Prince Edward Island. Her crew were rescued. She was on a voyage from Miramichi, New Brunswick to Liverpool.
Salette	Netherlands	The schooner was abandoned at sea. Her crew were rescued. She was on a voyage from Fredrikshavn to Hull, Yorkshire.
Sancta Paul	Flag unknown	The barque ran aground at Domesnes, Russia. She was refloated with assistance and taken in to Liepāja, Russia.
Scholastirne	France	The ship was driven ashore at Redheugh, Northumberland with the loss of seven of her crew.
Sea Belle	United Kingdom	The ship was driven ashore and wrecked on Antigua. Her crew were rescued.
Serene	United States	The barque was driven ashore at Cape Hatteras. She was on a voyage from Rio de Janeiro, Brazil to Baltimore.
Soblomsten	Norway	The schooner was abandoned at sea. She was on a voyage from Charleston, South Carolina, United States to Aarhus.
Sophia Hansen	Spain	The schooner was wrecked in Chesapeake Bay. Her crew were rescued. She was on a voyage from the Spanish Main to Baltimore.
St. Elvine	United Kingdom	The ship was driven ashore near Great Yarmouth, Norfolk. Her crew were rescued. She was on a voyage from Hamburg to Cardiff, Glamorgan.
Stemarthe	France	The sloop was driven ashore near Blyth. She as on a voyage from Calais to Blyth.
Susan L.	United States	The barque was wrecked at "Cape Ysabella".
Switzerland	Belgium	The steamship ran aground in the Scheldt. She was on a voyage from New York to Antwerp. She was refloated and completed her voyage.
Thomas Cochrane	United States	The ship was driven ashore at Cape Henlopen, Delaware before 20 December. She was on a voyage from Dublin, United Kingdom to the Delaware Breakwater. She was refloated with assistance.
Tinto	United Kingdom	The barque was driven ashore and wrecked at Kitty Hawk, North Carolina. She was on a voyage from Troon, Ayrshire to Baltimore.
Vesper	United Kingdom	The schooner was driven ashore and damaged at St. Saviour's Point, near Padstow, Cornwall. She was refloated with assistance.
Vigilant	Denmark	The schooner ran aground on the Swinegrund, in the Baltic Sea and was abandoned by her crew. She was on a voyage from an English port to Rudkøbing.
Walter and Albert	United Kingdom	The fishing smack foundered in the North Sea with the loss of all five crew.
Warden Appleby	United Kingdom	The brig was driven ashore and wrecked 57 nautical miles (106 km) south of "Hakodadi".
Warwick	United Kingdom	The brigantine was driven ashore at Sandhead, Wigtownshire. She was on a voyage from Maryport to Belfast.
Westmoreland	United Kingdom	The steamship ran aground in the Elbe. She was on a voyage from Liverpool to Hamburg. She was refloated on 31 December and taken in to Hamburg.
William T. Merchant	United States	The fishing schooner was sighted badly damaged after a gale in early December, probably sank in the next gale. All twelve crew were killed.
Willie	United Kingdom	The brig was driven ashore at the Languard Fort, Felixtowe, Suffolk. She was on a voyage from London to Ipswich, Suffolk. She was refloated and towed in to Harwich, Essex.
Zequeitio	Spain	The ship ran aground at Bilbao. She was later refloated with the assistance of tugs.
Two unnamed vessels	Flags unknown	The steamships capsized in the Pentland Firth.
Unnamed	Netherlands	The fishing smack foundered in the North Sea. Her thirteen crew were rescued by the steamship Maria (United Kingdom).
Two unnamed vessels	United Kingdom	The fishing smacks foundered in the North Sea with the loss of all hands. Witnessed by a Dutch fishing smack.
Unnamed	France	The lugger was driven ashore near Cruden, Aberdeenshire.
