= The Silver Sequence =

The Silver Sequence is a young adult fantasy novel trilogy by British author Cliff McNish.

== Novels ==
The books in this trilogy (in chronological order) are:

- The Silver Child
- Silver City
- Silver World

=== The Silver Child ===
The Silver Child is about a group of children in an abandoned ship building site called Coldharbour, given special talents dubbed by the young protagonists as "gifts" to fight a force known to them only as "The Roar". The novel initially follows an infant called Milo from his beginnings as an ordinary boy to his transformation into the Silver Child, an enormous entity of childlike proportions with wings and brightly shining skin - fated to act as the first line of defence against the Roar.

=== Silver City ===
In Silver City, all the children of the world are fleeing to Coldharbour. Milo is up in the sky, protecting the world from The Roar.

=== Silver World ===
The Roar is now at the forefront of her siege attack on Coldharbour and the Protector has been revived from the ocean floor, although it was fatally wounded by The Roar and Carnac in their last battle. To defeat The Roar and her two newborns, Helen must discover The Roar's weaknesses while Jenny transforms into a weapon to defeat The Roar, with the aid of Thomas' beauty.

== Characters ==
=== Milo ===
In the first book, Milo is a child who transforms into a Silver Child. In the second book, he has become an enormous Guardian Angel, watching over the city of Coldharbour and looking after all the children in the world. He has the ability to see children all over the world, not as children, but as silver dots of light. In the third book, Milo is a Protector who defends Coldharbour from The Roar.

=== Thomas ===
Thomas is a boy with a gift that he calls his "beauty". It finds the thing that a child most needs, and gives that thing to the child. This ability keeps Milo from entering the latter part of his transformation. It also transforms the Unearthers from humans into digging machines.

=== Emily and Freda ===
Emily and Freda are twin girls who can move extremely quickly over ground on their hands and feet. They are extremely agile, and Thomas first describes them as "insect girls". In the second book they are given the ability to swim underwater for incredible distances, and Emily almost dies. They are able to keep clean, even in Coldharbour.

=== Walter ===
Walter is a giant whose task is to protect children. When Milo gives him his task, however, he says, "Protect them all, Walter". Walter takes this to mean that he must protect all the children of the world, which occasionally confuses him! Although he has extraordinary muscles, he has a friendly nature, and hasn't let the children down yet.

=== Helen ===
Helen is a girl who can read minds. She is so used to this ability that, when she is unable to read the minds of the Unearthers (they are being shielded from her by Carnac), she is confused and upset. She has occasionally delved into the mind of The Roar, and it has taken these opportunities to read her mind and find out the defensive plans for the planet.

Helen is very lucky as she is the only child to have an adult relative in Coldharbour. In the third book, when The Roar moves the barrier while Helen's father is at a drop-off point, her father is trapped outside.

=== Dad ===
Helen's dad is very protective of his daughter, whose mother died when Helen was very young. He does everything that he can to prevent Helen being mixed up in this, but when he sees that she has to, he lets her, on the condition that he can be there too. We do not know his given name, as he is only called "Dad" in the series.

For a long time he is the only adult in Coldharbour, as there is a barrier that stops adults from getting in, which was placed after Dad arrived there.

The author reports that in the third book, Dad is suddenly left outside of Coldharbour. He was gathering food from one of the drop-off points when suddenly the barrier moved slightly, keeping him just outside the barrier surrounding the city.

=== Jenny ===
Jenny is Milo's sister. She seems able to see the future. At the end of Silver City, she uses the beauty given to her by Thomas to summon all the living things in the world to Coldharbour. In Silver World, she turns into a weapon against The Roar.

=== Carnac ===
Carnac is The Roar's son, who helped in the first fight between her and the Protector. He was left inside the world to grow, so that when he broke free he could take over the world and eat all its children. However, he was restrained by the will of the Protector, who was left lying at the bottom of the sea by The Roar. When The Roar returned to the world where Carnac was imprisoned, she was surprised to find him still there. In the Silver City Carnac takes over the minds of the Unearthers so they can literally "unearth" him and lose all sense of their previous personality. Then in the last book is killed by the Protector and the Unearthers.

=== The Roar ===
The Roar is an enormous creature, an eater of planets. After failing to be able to return to her home planet she is hunting the children of Earth in a last-ditch attempt to resolve her hunger. She has also shut down or eaten some of her body parts. Her newborn have also eaten parts of her, although she later ate them, so only two survive. She often refers to herself as an Assassin. She has found out some of the planet's defensive plans by reading Helen's mind when Helen tried to read hers.

=== The Protector ===
The Protector is the enemy of The Roar. After being shackled to the bottom of the sea for many centuries, a group of children, led by Emily and Freda, manage to free it. When it emerges, it seems helpful and talkative, if somewhat enigmatic, and often visits Helen in her mind, usually to offer advice.

=== Tanni and Parminder ===
Tanni and Parminder are two Unearthers, and digging partners (their drill parts on their hands slot together to become working drills). They start off as nice people, and turn into evil people who only want to free Carnac (who is controlling all of the Unearthers and Thomas's beauty). At the end of the book, when Carnac is removed from their minds, they return to being the people they were before their transformation. They then offer to wait underground for Carnac, and attack him when he escapes from his imprisonment.
