= SS Karnak (1898) =

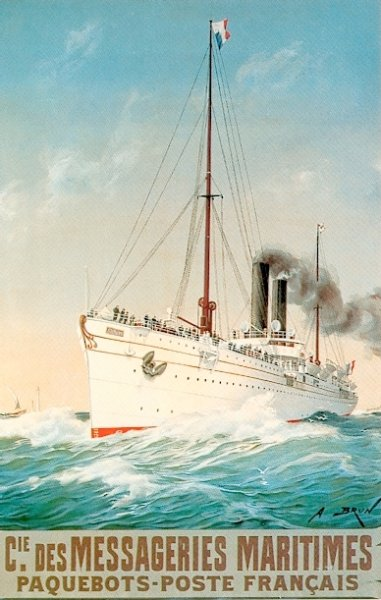
- SS Karnak when she was named Annam between 1899 and 1904

History
- Name: Annam (1899–1904); Tourane (1904–1912); Karnak (1912–1916)
- Namesake: Karnak, Egypt
- Owner: Messageries Maritimes
- Port of registry: (France) Marseille
- Route: Marseille – Malta – Saloniki
- Ordered: 1898
- Builder: Messageries Maritimes, La Ciotat
- Yard number: 114
- Launched: 1898
- Completed: September 1899
- Acquired: 1899
- Maiden voyage: 1899
- In service: 1899
- Identification: Official number: 5601059
- Fate: Torpedoed and sunk 27 November 1916

General characteristics
- Type: Passenger ship
- Tonnage: 6,816 GRT
- Length: 142 m (465 ft 11 in)
- Beam: 15.5 m (50 ft 10 in)
- Depth: 11 m (36 ft 1 in)
- Installed power: 2 x 3 cyl. triple expansion engines
- Propulsion: 2 screw propellers
- Speed: 18 knots (33 km/h; 21 mph)
- Capacity: 394 passengers

SS Karnak was a French passenger ship turned troop transport that the German submarine U-32 torpedoed on 27 November 1916 in the Mediterranean Sea 70 nautical miles (130 km; 81 mi) south south east of Valletta, Malta. Karnak was carrying mostly troops from Marseille and Malta to Saloniki, Greece.

== Construction ==
Karnak was built at the Messageries Maritimes shipyard in La Ciotat, France, in 1898 where she was launched and completed the following year. The ship was 142 metres (465 ft 11 in) long, had a beam of 15.5 metres (50 ft 10 in) and had a depth of 11 metres (36 ft 1 in). She was assessed at 6,816 gross register tons (GRT) and had two 3-cylinder triple expansion engines driving two screw propellers. The ship could reach a maximum speed of 18 knots (33 km/h; 21 mph) with her 20 boilers generating 832 nominal horsepower. She also had two funnels and a white hull which was later repainted to black.

== Sinking ==
During World War I Karnak was used as a troop transport by the French Admiralty mainly on the route between Marseille, Malta, and Saloniki. It was during a voyage from Malta to Saloniki, Greece, when the with troops crowded aboard when Karnak was torpedoed and sunk by the German submarine U-32 on 27 November 1916, 70 nautical miles (130 km; 81 mi) south south east of Valletta, Malta. The ship sank in 15 minutes and claimed the lives of 17 people, but the number of survivors is unknown.

== Wreck ==
The wreck of Karnak lies at (35°07′N 15°25′E).
