= Study on Global Ageing and Adult Health =

The Study on global AGEing and adult health (SAGE) is run by the World Health Organization. An objective for SAGE is to compile comprehensive longitudinal data on the health and well-being of adult populations and the ageing process across different countries, through primary data collection, secondary data analysis and cross-study collaborations.

SAGE baseline data (Wave 0, 2002–04) was collected as part of WHO's World Health Survey (WHS). A second round of data collection (Wave 1, 2007–10) is completed, expanding the sample sizes in each participating country (China, Ghana, India, Mexico, the Russian Federation and South Africa). Wave 2 (2014/15) data collection was completed in 2015. Wave 3 has been implemented in 2017/19.

== SAGE Wave 0 (2002/04) ==
A baseline cohort for the six participating countries was created as part of the larger World Health Survey effort and contains data on the situation of 65,964 adults aged 18 years and older, including over 20,000 persons aged 50 years and older. Samples of these respondents were followed-up as a part of SAGE Wave 1 (2007–10) data collection in four of the six SAGE countries (Ghana, India, Mexico and the Russian Federation). Meta- and micro-data are in the public domain through WHO at http://apps.who.int/healthinfo/systems/surveydata/index.php/catalog/whs.

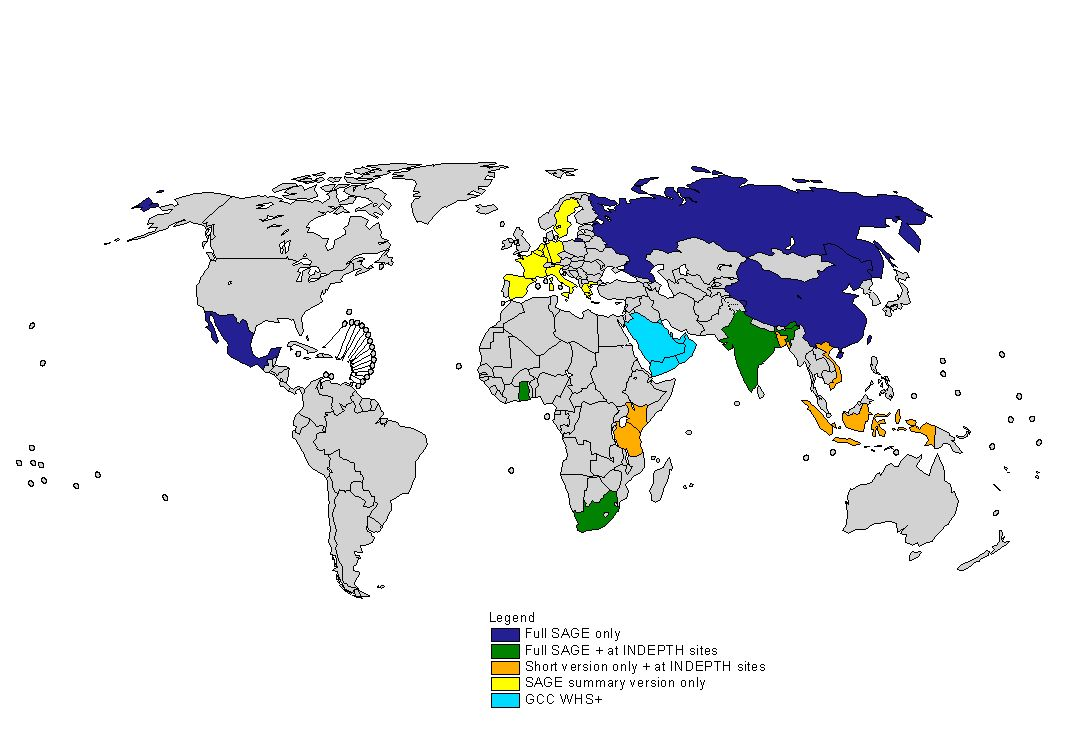
Countries collaborating with SAGE

== SAGE Wave 1 (2007/10) ==
Weighted data for China, Ghana, India, Mexico, Russian Federation and South Africa are in the public domain (see Study on global AGEing and Adult Health). SAGE's first full round of data collection included both follow-up and new respondents in four participating countries. The goal of the sampling design was to obtain a nationally representative cohort of persons aged 50 years and older, with a smaller cohort of persons aged 18 to 49 for comparison purposes. The target sample size was 5000 households with at least one person aged 50+ years and 1000 households with an 18- to 49-year-old respondent. In the older households, all persons aged 50+ years (for example, spouses and siblings) were invited to participate. Proxy respondents were identified for respondents who were unable to respond for themselves. The pooled data set will include over 43,000 respondents (see table below).

Modules in SAGE W1 Questionnaires
Household Questionnaire
- 0100 Sampling Information
- 0200 Geocoding and GPS Information
- 0300 Recontact Information
- 0350 Contact Record
- 0400 Household Roster
- 0450 Kish Tables and Household Consent
- 0500 Housing
- 0600 Household and Family Support Networks and Transfers
- 0700 Assets and Household Income
- 0800 Household Expenditures
- 0900 Verbal Autopsy

Individual Questionnaire
- 1000 Socio-Demographic Characteristics
- 1500 Work History and Benefits
- 2000 Health State Descriptions and Vignettes
- 2500 Anthropometrics, Performance Tests and Biomarkers
  - Including: blood pressure, pulse rate, hip & waist circumferences, height, weight, grip strength, timed walk, vision, lung function, cognition, finger prick blood sample
- 3000 Risk Factors and Preventive Health Behaviours
- 4000 Chronic Conditions and Health Services Coverage
- 5000 Health Care Utilization
- 6000 Social Cohesion
- 7000 Subjective Well-Being and Quality of Life
  - (WHOQoL-8 & the Day Reconstruction Method) See also: Happiness
- 8000 Impact of Caregiving
- 9000 Interviewer Assessment

Proxy Questionnaire
- 0 Proxy Consent Form
- 1 IQ Code
- 2 Health State Descriptions
- 4 Chronic Conditions and Health Services Coverage
- 5 Health Care Utilization

== Data collected, Wave 1 ==
Standardized SAGE survey instruments were used in all countries consisting of five main parts: 1) household questionnaire; 2) individual questionnaire; 3) proxy questionnaire; 4) verbal autopsy questionnaire; and, 5) appendices including showcards. A question by question guide (Survey Manual) is available. A VAQ was completed for deaths in the household over the last 24 months. The procedures for including country-specific adaptations to the standardized questionnaire and translations into local languages from English follow those developed by and used for the World Health Survey.

Country	World Bank economic category (2007)	Sample Size
China	Lower-Middle	14785
Ghana	Low	5573
India	Low	12198
Mexico	Upper-Middle	2734
Russian Federation	Upper-Middle	4947
South Africa	Upper-Middle	4227

Descriptive results from SAGE Wave 1 are available through a US Census Bureau/WHO report Shades of Gray: A Cross-Country Study of Health and Well-Being of the Older Populations in SAGE Countries, 2007-2010.

Background information on SAGE is also available through:
Kowal P, Chatterji S, Naidoo N, Biritwum R, Wu Fan, Lopez Ridaura R, Maximova T, Arokiasamy P, Phaswana-Mafuya N, Peltzer K, Williams S, Snodgrass JJ, Minicuci N, D'Este C, Boerma JT and the SAGE Collaborators. Data Resource Profile: The WHO Study on global AGEing and adult health (SAGE). Int J Epidemiol. 2012;41(6):1639-49.

== SAGE Wave 2 (2014/15) ==
Data collection for SAGE Wave 2 was completed in 2015 in all SAGE countries. The Russian Federation hold Wave 2 data. Data can be requested through the WHO data archive at https://apps.who.int/healthinfo/systems/surveydata/index.php/catalog/whs/?page=1&ps=15&repo=whs

== SAGE Wave 3 (2017/19) ==
Data for SAGE Wave 3 in China, Ghana, India, Mexico and South Africa will be available through the WHO multi-country studies data archive https://apps.who.int/healthinfo/systems/surveydata/index.php/catalog/whs/?page=1&ps=15&repo=whs.

== Links to other studies ==
SAGE adapted methods and instruments used by the WHS and/or from 16 surveys on ageing (including the US Health and Retirement Survey (HRS) and the UK English Longitudinal Study of Ageing (ELSA) to collect household data on persons aged 50 years and older in over 20 countries, as well as fostering links to other data collection efforts such as the Study on Health, Ageing and Retirement in Europe (SHARE), the Chinese Health and Retirement Survey (CHARLs), the Longitudinal Ageing Study in India (LASI).

An R21-funded effort, SAGE+ Wave 1 - which harmonized data from SAGE, HRS, ELSA and SHARE, resulted in a first publication in 2016. Minicuci N, Naidoo N, Chatterji S, Kowal P. Data Resource Profile: Cross-national and cross-study sociodemographic and health-related harmonized domains from SAGE plus ELSA, HRS and SHARE (SAGE+), Wave 1 Int J Epidemiol. 2016. (NIA grant R21AG034263)

SAGE-like surveys have been conducted as the World Health Survey Plus (WHS+) in the Gulf Cooperation Council countries, as a short version of SAGE in eight demographic surveillance fieldsites INDEPTH; as a full SAGE in three INDEPTH fieldsites; and, as COURAGE in Europe in three European countries.

- SAGE Tunisia was completed in 2016. (see, Wisniewski A, DeLouize AM, Walker T, et al. Sustained metabolic dysregulation and the emergence of diabetes: associations between HbA1c and metabolic syndrome components in Tunisian diabetic and nondiabetic groups. J Physiol Anthropol 43, 18 (2024). https://doi.org/10.1186/s40101-024-00365-4.)
- SAGE Al-Ain (UAE) started interviews in April 2017.
- SAGE Mongolia was completed in 2018 (see for example, Yiengprugsawan V, Dorj G, Drackis JG, et al. Disparities in outpatient and inpatient utilization by rural-urban areas among older Mongolians based on a modified WHO-SAGE instrument. BMC Health Serv Res. 2021;21(1):1183. https://pubmed.ncbi.nlm.nih.gov/34717613/ )

== SAGE Salt & Tobacco nested sub-study in SAGE Ghana and SAGE South Africa Waves 2 and 3 ==
A goal of this sub-study is to monitor change in cardiovascular outcomes associated with salt reduction, including blood pressure, and examine tobacco consumption levels and patterns. One wave of spot and 24-hr urine capture plus urinary sodium and potassium measurements was completed as part of WHO's SAGE Wave 2 (2014/15) in Ghana and South Africa. A follow-up wave of urine capture will be nested within SAGE Wave 3 (2017). Incorporation of the gold standard measure of salt intake (24h urine samples) to assess habitual salt consumption and GATS harmonized tobacco questions. Sodium, potassium, iodine and cotinine will be assessed in the urine samples. This sub-study is supported by an agreement with the CDC Foundation with financial support provided by Bloomberg Philanthropies, a Partnerships & Research Development Fund (PRDF) grant from the Australia Africa Universities Network, and WHO.

See, Charlton et al. BMJ Open. 2016;6(11):e013316. DOI:10.1136/bmjopen-2016-013316

== SAGE-INDEPTH ==
Data for the summary SAGE module added to INDEPTH census rounds in 2007 and 2008 (Wave 1) are available through WHO SAGE and INDEPTH. These data include the SAGE health state descriptions, WHO Disability Assessment Timetable version 2 (WHODAT 2.0) and the WHO Quality of Life (WHOQoL, pronounced "Who call?") 8-item version as measures of health and subjective well-being, linked to selected sociodemographic data from the demographic surveillance fieldsites in eight countries (Bangladesh, Ghana, India, Indonesia, Kenya, South Africa, Tanzania and Viet Nam). The sample size is over 46,000 respondents. First results are published as 'Growing Older in Africa and Asia: Multicentre study on ageing, health and well-being' in the peer-reviewed open-access journal, Global Health Action.

Country (DSS Fieldsite)	World Bank economic category	Sample Size
Bangladesh (Matlab)	Low	4037
Ghana (Navrongo)	Lower-Middle	4584
India (Vadu)	Lower-Middle	5430
Indonesia (Purworejo)	Lower-Middle	12395
Kenya (Nairobi)	Low	2072
South Africa (Agincourt)	Upper-Middle	4085
Tanzania (Ifakara)	Low	5131
Viet Nam (Filabavi)	Lower-Middle	8535

Wave 2 - the INDEPTH Network is responsible for implementing Wave 2.

== SAGE-WOPS HIV study ==
Three waves of the SAGE Well-being of Older People Study (WOPS) HIV study have been conducted in two countries, South Africa and Uganda, with the goal of providing data on the effects of HIV/AIDS among older people infected or affected by HIV. The aim of this study was to describe the health status, well being and functional status among older people either infected with HIV themselves, or affected by HIV/AIDS in their families. The impacts of caregiving and ART were also examined. Wave 1 was completed in 2010/11 and Wave 2 was completed in 2013. Wave 3 was completed in 2016/17, and Wave 4 will be implemented in 2019. Two papers from Wave 1 results are listed below.

Scholten F, Mugisha J, Seeley J, Kinyanda E, Nakubukwa S, Kowal P, Naidoo N, Boerma T, Chatterji S, Grosskurth H. Health and functional status among older people with HIV/AIDS in Uganda. BMC Pub Health. 2011;11:886.

Nyirenda M, Chatterji S, Falkingham J, Mutevedzi P, Hosegood V, Evandrou M, Kowal P, Newell M-L. An investigation of factors associated with the health and wellbeing of HIV-infected and HIV-affected older people in rural South Africa. BMC Pub Health. 2012;12:259.

== Direction ==
WHO SAGE consists of Dr Paul Kowal as co-Principal Investigator, Ms Nirmala Naidoo as co-Principal Investigator and lead statistician, and Dr Somnath Chatterji as co-Principal Investigator, with support from technical leads across WHO's Geneva, Regional and Country Offices. Survey teams in each participating country led the data capture efforts, from data collection to dissemination, and contribute to analysis and manuscript preparation.

Wave 1 country Primary Investigators: Dr Wu Fan, Shanghai CDC, China; Prof Richard Biritwum, University of Ghana, Ghana; P Arokiasamy, IIPS, India; Ms Rosalba Roja, Dr Ruy López Ridaura, Dr Mara Tellez Rojo, INSP, Mexico; Dr Tamara Maximova, RAMS, Russian Federation; and, Dr Refilwe Nancy Phaswana-Mafuya and Dr Karl Peltzer, HSRC, South Africa.
Wave 2 country Primary Investigators: Dr Wu Fan, Shanghai CDC, China; Prof Richard Biritwum and Dr Alfred Yawson, University of Ghana, Ghana; P Arokiasamy, IIPS, India; Mr Aaron Salinas Rodriguez and Ms Betty Soledad Manrique Espinoza, INSP, Mexico; and, Dr Stephen Rule, Outsourced Insight, South Africa.
Wave 3 country Primary Investigators: Dr Wu Fan, Shanghai CDC, China; Prof Richard Biritwum and Dr Alfred Yawson, University of Ghana, Ghana; P Arokiasamy, IIPS, India; Mr Aaron Salinas Rodriguez and Ms Betty Soledad Manrique Espinoza, INSP, Mexico; and, Dr Stephen Rule, HSRC, South Africa.
Wave 4 was implemented in China and Mexico, with Primary Investigators: Dr Wu Fan, Shanghai Medical College at Fudan University (SHMU), PR China; and, Mr Aaron Salinas Rodriguez and Ms Betty Soledad Manrique Espinoza, INSP, Mexico.

== Funding ==
SAGE and SAGE sub-studies are supported by the World Health Organization and the Division of Behavioral and Social Research at the National Institute on Aging (NIA BSR), US National Institutes of Health, through Interagency Agreements (OGHA 04034785; YA1323-08-CN-0020; Y1-AG-1005-01) with WHO and a Research Project Grant R01 AG034479. NIA BSR has facilitated forums for in-depth discussions about study content, design and implementation. The NIA BSR has been instrumental in promoting linkages between longitudinal studies on ageing and adult health around the world.

Governments in three countries, China, Mexico and South Africa, provided financial support for SAGE Wave 1. The University of Ghana provided financial and in-kind support. USAID funding contributed to an oversample of adult women in SAGE India Wave 1. The Shanghai Municipal Government provided support for SAGE Wave 2 in China, while the University of Ghana provided financial and in-kind support.

Wave 3 was supported through NIA Research Project Grant R01 AG034479 and in-kind or financial support from implementing partners in collaborating countries. Seeking co-funding from governments.

SAGE Salt & Tobacco sub-study is supported by an agreement with the CDC Foundation with financial support provided by Bloomberg Philanthropies, a Partnerships & Research Development Fund (PRDF) grant from the Australia Africa Universities Network, and WHO.

The European Commission under Seventh Framework Programme has provided financial support to implement a SAGE-like health status, quality of life and well-being study in Europe under the name "collaborative research on ageing in Europe (COURAGE in Europe)". Finland, Poland and Spain implemented the survey in 2010.
