= China Health and Retirement Longitudinal Study =

The China Health and Retirement Longitudinal Study (CHARLS) is a longitudinal survey being conducted by the China Center for Economic Research at Peking University with Professor Yaohui Zhao of Peking University serving as Principal Investigator and Professors John Strauss of the University of Southern California and Albert Park of HKUST Institute for Emerging Market Studies serving as co-Principal Investigators.

== Goals ==
The survey will collect a representative sample of Chinese 45 and older every two years to enable multidisciplinary studies on issues related to population ageing. China is one of the fastest ageing countries in the world and accounts for a large fraction of the growth in the world's old. By 2050, China's elderly (65 and older) population share is expected to reach 30%.

== Funding ==
The pilot survey is funded by the National Institute on Aging, the World Bank, and Natural Science Foundation of China.

== Data Collection ==
The questionnaire contains information on household demographics, transfers among family members, health status, health care, employment, income, consumption and assets, as well as information on health facilities of the community and government policies in local areas. The CHARLS is designed on the models of health and retirement studies originated from the Health and Retirement Study (HRS) in the U.S., but has the advantage of including information on the community the respondent resides and local policies. Due to large internal variations of government policies, the data will enable analyses of policy impacts in the process of population ageing. Other countries participating in this international network of ageing studies include England, fifteen countries in continental Europe, Israel, India, Korea, and Japan.

=== Initial Results ===
The pilot survey was conducted in two provinces (Zhejiang and Gansu) in 2008 and collected data on roughly 1,600 households. The pilot data of 2008 has been released to the research community since April 30, 2009. The national baseline survey is being planned for 2011. CHARLS data will be available for download by researchers at no cost.

== Sister studies ==
- The Health and Retirement Study (HRS)
- English Longitudinal Study of Ageing (ELSA)
- The Survey of Health, Ageing and Retirement in Europe (SHARE)
- Korean Longitudinal Study of Ageing (KLoSA)
