= Kenneth M. Langa =

American physician

Kenneth M. Langa is an American physician and social scientist known for his work on aging, cognitive decline, and dementia. He is the A. Regula Herzog Distinguished University Professor of Internal Medicine and Survey Research at the University of Michigan and an investigator in longitudinal studies of health and retirement in aging populations.

In 2024, he was elected to the National Academy of Medicine.

== Early life and education ==
Langa grew up in New Jersey and completed his undergraduate education at Amherst College, graduating summa cum laude with a BA in sociology in 1985. During this time, he was a visiting undergraduate at Harvard University. He pursued clinical and academic training at the University of Chicago as a Fellow in the Pew Program for Medicine, Arts and the Social Sciences, earning a PhD in Public Policy in 1992 and an MD in 1994.

== Academic career ==
During his MD–PhD training, Langa studied the impact of US cost-containment policies on the healthcare provided to those in poverty, publishing his first research article on this topic in the New England Journal of Medicine in 1993.

In 1994, he moved to the University of Michigan for an internal medicine residency and later completed the Robert Wood Johnson Clinical Scholars Program. In 1997, he reconnected with Robert J. Willis, his dissertation advisor at the University of Chicago, who had moved to the University of Michigan to become the principal investigator of the Health and Retirement Study (HRS).

Langa joined the University of Michigan faculty in 1999 and progressed from assistant professor to tenured professor. He currently holds joint appointments in the Medical School and the Institute for Social Research, and serves as co-director of the Health and Retirement Study, and co-director of the Harmonized Cognitive Assessment Protocol (HCAP) international network.

Langa has been a visiting professor at institutions including the University of Cambridge, the World Health Organization (WHO) in Geneva, the University of California, San Francisco (UCSF), the University of New South Wales in Sydney, and the University of Otago in Dunedin.

== Research and contributions ==
Langa's research has made substantial contributions to understanding the epidemiology, risk factors, outcomes, and societal impacts of cognitive aging and dementia. His work combines rigorous population science with clinical insight to inform policies and interventions aimed at improving the health and well-being of older adults. Much of his research is conducted through and alongside the Health and Retirement Study (HRS), the largest and longest-running nationally representative longitudinal study of U.S. adults—and its international partner studies. A 2013 front-page NY Times article reported that the HRS is "considered a gold standard among researchers on aging issues."

Langa has made significant contributions to the world-wide growth of the Health and Retirement Study (HRS) model of population studies. There are currently more than thirty-five countries that field surveys modeled on the HRS and Langa is a co-investigator or consultant to many of those studies.

Langa's work is often cited as part of US public policy deliberations, including a 2023 NY Times series on the need for major reforms of the US long-term care system. A central focus of Langa's work is measurement of cognitive function and dementia in population studies, including development and implementation of the Harmonized Cognitive Assessment Protocol (HCAP), which harmonizes in-depth cognitive assessments across different countries to allow valid cross-national comparisons.

He has published methodological papers describing the design, psychometric properties, and cross-country applications of HCAP¬-based cognitive batteries. Langa's substantive research includes national estimates of dementia prevalence and mild cognitive impairment in older Americans using HRS and HCAP data, documenting how these burdens vary by age, race, education, and socioeconomic status. His studies in leading journals have also examined trends over time and disparities in cognitive outcomes.

Langa was the senior author on two of the most-widely cited papers that use HRS data, including a study led by Dr. Jack Iwashyna on the long-term physical and cognitive outcomes associated with sepsis published in JAMA in 2010, and a study of the economic cost of dementia in the US led by Professor Michael Hurd published in the New England Journal of Medicine in 2013. He has investigated risk and protective factors for cognitive decline and dementia, including cardiovascular risk profiles, acute illnesses such as sepsis or stroke, genetic and lifestyle influences, and health behaviors, producing widely cited findings on lifestyle, genetic risk, and dementia incidence. Langa's work further explores the social, economic, and health-system consequences of aging and cognitive impairmentt, including the costs of Alzheimer's disease and related dementias, financial impacts on individuals and families, and patterns of health-care utilization among older adults. In addition to his dementia research, he collaborates on international and comparative studies of aging, including cognitive health differences across countries, and adaptations of cognitive measures in diverse settings such as rural Kenya.

== Awards and honors ==
In 2024, Langa was elected to the National Academy of Medicine.

He was also named the A. Regula Herzog Distinguished University Professor of Internal Medicine and Survey Research by the University of Michigan Board of Regents in 2025.

Langa is also an elected member of both the American Society for Clinical Investigation (ASCI) and a fellow of the American Association for the Advancement of Science (AAAS).
