= Max Planck Institute for Social Law and Social Policy =

Research institute in Munich, Germany

- Max-Planck-Institut für Sozialrecht und Sozialpolitik
- Abbreviation: MPI-SOC
- Formation: 1 July 2011; 15 years ago
- Type: Research institute
- Purpose: Basic research
- Location: Munich, Germany
- Coordinates: 48°08′26″N 11°34′57″E
- Fields: Jurisprudence, social and behavioural sciences
- Managing director: Ulrich Becker
- Parent organization: Max Planck Society
- Website: www.mpisoc.mpg.de

The Max Planck Institute for Social Law and Social Policy (German: Max-Planck-Institut für Sozialrecht und Sozialpolitik) is a research institute located in Munich, Germany.

== History ==
The institute traces its origins to the Max Planck Institute for Foreign and International Social Law, founded in 1980, which evolved from a project group established by the Max Planck Society in 1976. In July 2011, the Institute for Foreign and International Social Law merged with the Munich Center for the Economics of Aging (MEA) headed by Axel Börsch-Supan, resulting in the creation of the Max Planck Institute for Social Law and Social Policy.

== Conducted Research ==
The Department of Foreign and International Social Law is dedicated to fundamental research in the field of foreign and international social law. The Munich Center for the Economics of Aging (MEA) studies the micro- and macroeconomic aspects of demographic change including saving and retirement decisions, pension systems, health of older people. Also the Survey of Health, Ageing and Retirement in Europe is coordinated at MEA.

== Max Planck Law ==
The institute is part of the research network Max Planck Law.
