= Health and Retirement Study =

- Administered by the University of Michigan

Agency overview
- Formed: 1992
- Jurisdiction: United States
- Headquarters: Institute for Social Research, University of Michigan, Ann Arbor, MI
- Parent agency: National Institute on Aging University of Michigan
- Website: hrs.isr.umich.edu

The Health and Retirement Study (HRS) is a nationally representative panel survey of U.S. adults aged 51 years and older conducted by the Survey Research Center (SRC) at the Institute for Social Research (ISR) at the University of Michigan in Ann Arbor. Funded by the National Institute on Aging (NIA) and the Social Security Administration (SSA), the HRS collects data to support research on how older adults make decisions and adapt as policy, economic conditions, and health circumstances change. Conducted every two years since 1992, the study has surveyed over 51,000 participants.

The HRS core interview covers respondents’ finances (income and assets), work and retirement, health status and health care utilization, cognitive function, and family relationships. In 2006, data collection expanded to physical measures, blood-based biomarkers, genetics, and a range of information on psychological states and social contexts. The data can be matched (under restricted-access conditions) to several administrative sources, including records from the Social Security Administration, the Centers for Medicare & Medicaid Services, the Department of Veterans Affairs, the National Death Index, and the 1940 U.S. Census. The study also provides linked contextual measures such as policy and environmental indicators and food-access measures. Pension plan details supplied by the employer are also available. The Harmonized Cognitive Assessment Protocol (HCAP) is an HRS substudy and part of an NIA-funded international collaboration that uses a common assessment protocol to study cognitive aging and dementia risk across multiple longitudinal aging studies worldwide.

As of 2026, HRS is led by co-directors Kenneth M. Langa and Jessica Faul, as well as associate directors Brady West and Jody Schimmel Hyde; all are affiliated with the University of Michigan.

== History ==
Planning for what became the HRS began in the mid-1980s, as researchers at the NIA and other institutions argued that existing U.S. data systems were not keeping pace with population aging and the policy questions it raised. At the time, the Retirement History Study (RHS)—a foundational dataset for retirement research—was viewed as increasingly dated for studying newer retirement patterns and program changes. Scholars also noted that research on retirement and later-life health was often conducted within disciplinary boundaries, limiting integration across fields such as economics, sociology, psychology, epidemiology, demography, and biomedicine.

In early 1988, after NIA convened an ad hoc advisory panel, the panel recommended launching a long-running national study that could jointly examine health changes, socioeconomic and psychological circumstances, and retirement-related decisions in later life. Development involved collaboration among federal staff and researchers from multiple disciplines, and the project ultimately received support from relevant executive agencies and the U.S. Congress, leading to the establishment of the HRS.

== Administrative information ==
The HRS is sustained by contributions from many individuals and organizations involved in its design, operations, and governance. Key figures in its leadership history include F. Thomas Juster (who helped launch the study), Robert J. Willis (director, 1995–2007), and David R. Weir (director, 2007–2025).

The project operates under an NIA–HRS cooperative agreement (U01AG009740). NIA is the primary funder, and the Institute for Social Research's Survey Research Center is responsible for fielding and administering the survey. HRS scientific guidance also comes from its co-investigators across Michigan and other U.S. institutions, along with the NIA–HRS Data Monitoring Committee.

Since HRS began, the Social Security Administration has provided technical guidance and substantial support. Additional partners have included the U.S. Department of Labor’s Pension and Welfare Benefits Administration, the U.S. Department of Health and Human Services (Office of the Assistant Secretary for Planning and Evaluation), and the State of Florida.

== Data access ==
HRS follows an open-data approach while using tiered access controls to protect participant confidentiality. Data are distributed in three categories—public, sensitive, and restricted—with progressively stronger access requirements. Public-use files can be downloaded by registered users, whereas sensitive and restricted files require additional approvals.

The RAND Corporation’s Center for the Study of Aging produces the RAND HRS files under contract to HRS. These files reformat and harmonize many variables from the HRS public-use datasets to make them easier to use. RAND HRS products can be obtained through the HRS data portal.

HRS also publishes Using the HRS: A Guide for New Users, which introduces the study design and content and describes common data-management and analysis tasks; the guide includes example code for several statistical packages (including R, SAS, SPSS, and Stata).

== Research findings and impact ==
The HRS was created to enable research on aging, and the data are widely used in the U.S. and internationally. There are thousands of publications based on HRS and large numbers of registered users and downloads. The National Institutes of Health has funded numerous projects that analyze HRS data. Findings from HRS-based research have been cited in both scholarly and policy contexts. For instance, a prominent 2013 analysis used HRS-linked data to estimate the economic burden of Alzheimer’s disease and related dementias in the United States; HRS results have also informed reporting and debate on long-term care financing and system capacity.

== International studies ==
As population aging has accelerated globally, the HRS approach has been adapted in many countries through the “International Family of Studies,” a set of longitudinal aging surveys modelled on the HRS. Design and questionnaire comparability across these studies is supported by the NIA-funded Health and Retirement Studies Around the World harmonization network (R24AG037866).

Cross-national analysis is further enabled by the NIA-supported Gateway to Global Aging Data, developed at the University of Southern California (RC2 AG036619-01; R01 AG030153). The Gateway provides tools such as a repository of questionnaire content, interfaces for locating comparable items across surveys, and harmonized variables intended for comparative research.

Studies in the HRS International Family of Studies include:

- English Longitudinal Study of Ageing (ELSA)
- Mexican Health and Aging Study (MHAS)
- Survey of Health, Ageing and Retirement in Europe (SHARE)
- Costa Rican Longevity and Healthy Aging Study (CRELES)
- Korean Longitudinal Study of Aging (KLoSA)
- The Japanese Study of Aging and Retirement (JSTAR)
- The Irish Longitudinal Study on Ageing (TILDA)
- The Chinese Health and Retirement Survey (CHARLS)
- Health and Aging in Africa: Longitudinal Studies in South Africa (HAALSA)
- The Northern Ireland Cohort for the Longitudinal Study of Ageing (NICOLA)
- Brazilian Longitudinal Study of Aging (ELSI Brasil)
- Health, Aging, and Retirement in Thailand (HART)
- Longitudinal Aging Study in India (LASI)
- Chilean Social Protection Survey's Survey of Quality of Life of the Elderly (SPS-ENCAVIDAM)
- Malaysian Ageing and Retirement Survey (MARS)
- New Zealand Health, Work and Retirement Survey (HWR)
- WHO's Study on Global Ageing and Adult Health (SAGE)
- Indonesian Family Life Survey (IFLS)

== Bibliography ==
- Sonnega, A., Faul, J., Ofstedal, M.B., Langa, K., Phillips, J., & Weir, D. (2014). Cohort profile: the Health and Retirement Study (HRS). International Journal of Epidemiology, 43, 576-585. doi: 10.1093/ije/dyu067
