= Population ageing =

Increasing median age in a population

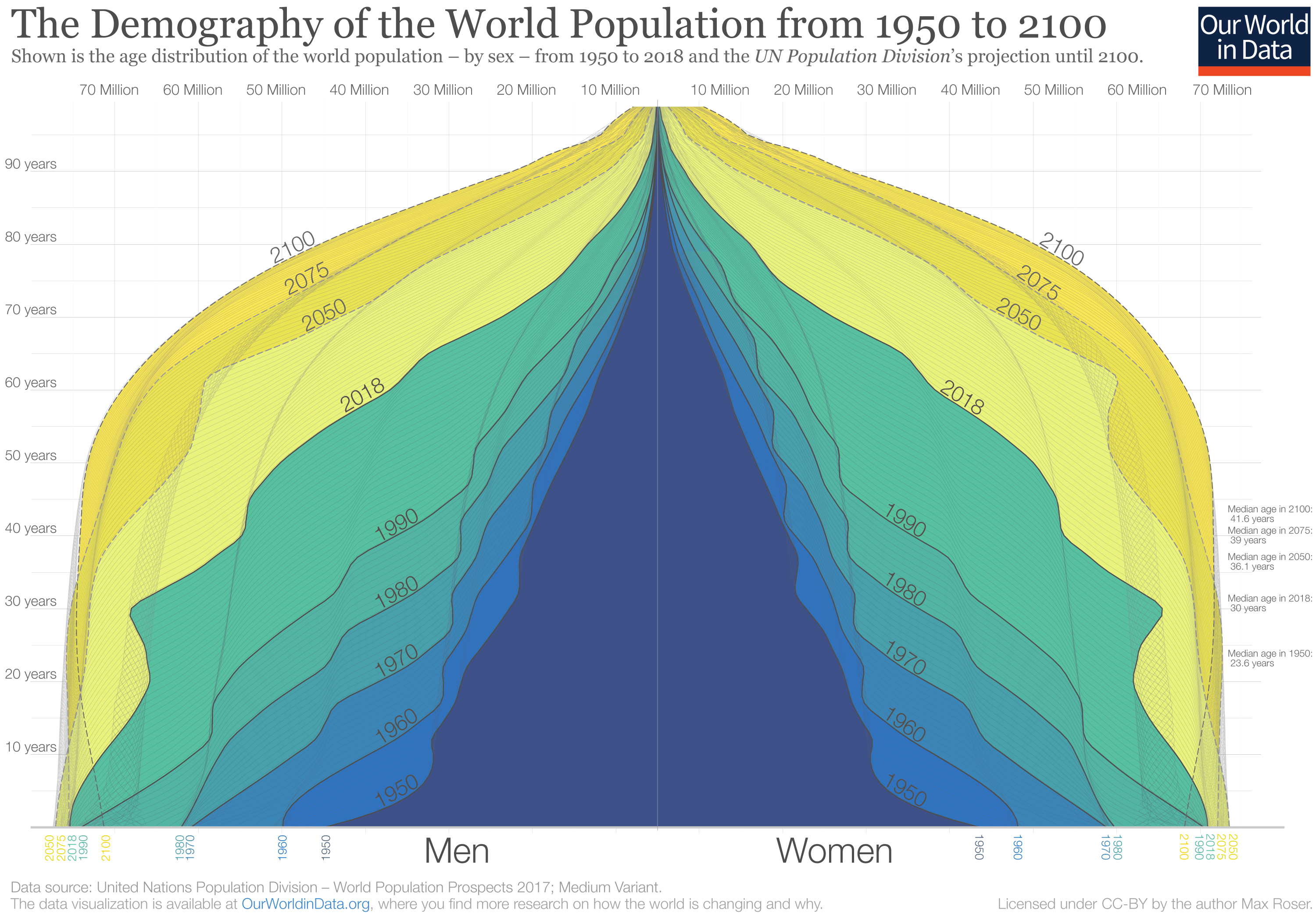
World population pyramid from 1950 to 2100 (projected). (UN, World Population Prospects 2017)

World age group populations from 1950 to 2100 (projected).

Population ageing is an overall change in the ages of a population. This can typically be summarised in a single parameter as an increase in the median age. Causes are a long-term decline in fertility rates and a decline in mortality rates. Most countries now have declining mortality rates and an ageing population: trends that emerged first in developed countries but are now also seen in virtually all developing countries. In most developed countries, population ageing started in the late 19th century. By the late 20th century, the world population as a whole was also ageing. The proportion of people aged 65 and above accounts for 6% of the total population. This reflects a historic overall decline in the world's average fertility rate. That is the case for every country in the world except the 18 countries designated as "demographic outliers" by the United Nations. The aged population is currently at its highest level in human history. The UN projects that the population will age faster in the 21st century than in the 20th. The number of people aged 60 years and over has tripled since 1950; it reached 600 million in 2000 and surpassed 700 million in 2006. It is projected that the combined senior and geriatric population will reach 2.1 billion by 2050. Countries vary significantly in terms of the degree and pace of ageing, and the UN expects populations that began ageing later will have less time to respond to its implications. Policy interventions include preventative strategies that increase the size of the young, working-age population, as well as adaptive measures to make overarching systems compatible with a new demographic future.

== Overview ==
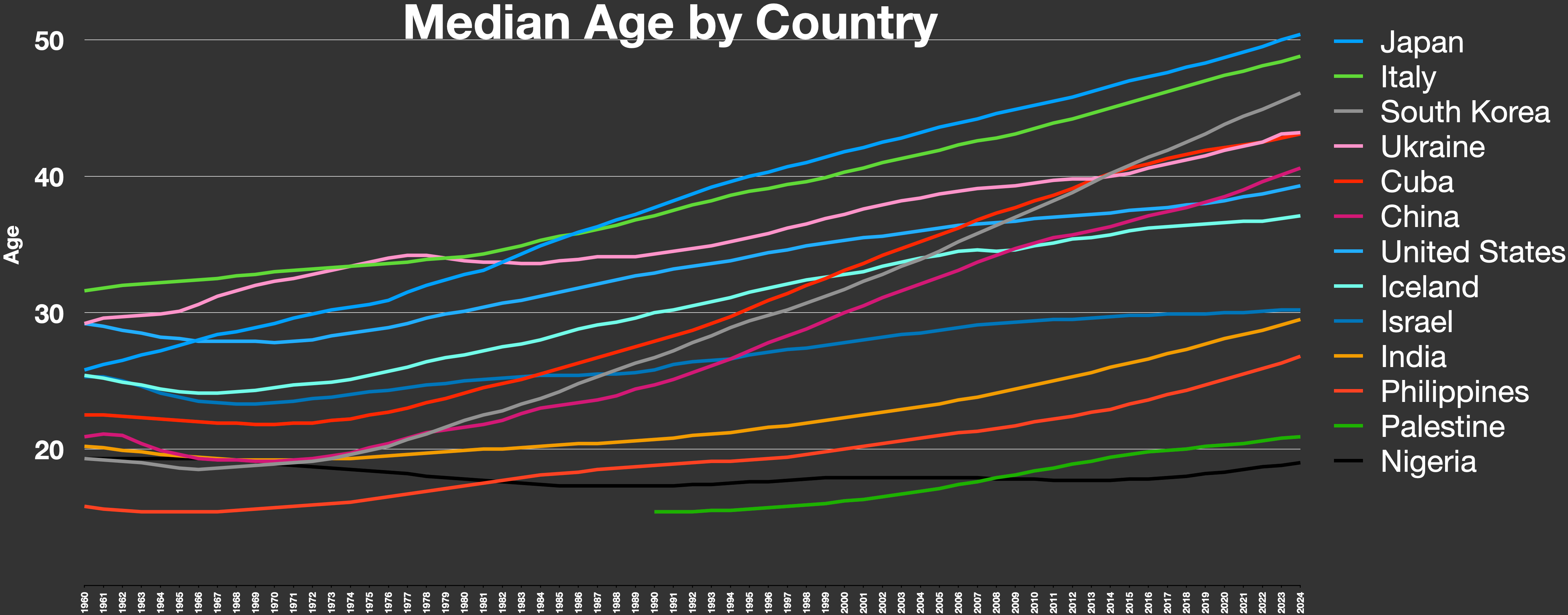
Median age by country

Population ageing is a shift in the distribution of a country's population towards older ages and is usually reflected in an increase in the population's mean and median ages, a decline in the proportion of the population composed of children, and a rise in the proportion of the population composed of the elderly. Population ageing is widespread across the world and is most advanced in the most highly developed countries, but it is growing faster in less developed regions, which means that older persons will be increasingly concentrated in the less developed regions of the world. The Oxford Institute of Population Ageing, however, concluded that population ageing has slowed considerably in Europe and will have the greatest future impact in Asia, especially since Asia is in stage five (very low birth rate and low death rate) of the demographic transition model.

Among the countries currently classified by the United Nations as more developed (with a total population of 1.2 billion in 2005), the overall median age rose from 28 in 1950 to 40 in 2010 and is forecast to rise to 44 by 2050. The corresponding figures for the world as a whole are 24 in 1950, 29 in 2010, and 36 in 2050. For the less developed regions, the median age will go from 26 in 2010 to 35 in 2050.

Population ageing arises from two, possibly related, demographic effects: increasing longevity and declining fertility. An increase in longevity raises the average age of the population by increasing the numbers of surviving older people. A decline in fertility reduces the number of babies, and as the effect continues, the numbers of younger people in general also reduce. Of the two forces, declining fertility now contributes to most of the population ageing in the world. More specifically, the large decline in the overall fertility rate over the last half-century is primarily responsible for the population ageing in the world's most developed countries. Because many developing countries are going through faster fertility transitions, they will experience even faster population ageing than the currently-developed countries will.

The rate at which the population ages is likely to increase over the next three decades; however, few countries know whether their older population are living the extra years of life in good or poor health. A "compression of morbidity" would imply reduced disability in old age, but an expansion would see an increase in poor health with increased longevity. Another option has been posed for a situation of "dynamic equilibrium." That is crucial information for governments if the limits of lifespan continue to increase indefinitely, as some researchers believe. The World Health Organization's suite of household health studies is working to provide the needed health and well-being evidence, such as the World Health Survey, and the Study on Global Ageing and Adult Health (SAGE). The surveys cover 308,000 respondents aged at least 18 and 81,000 aged at least 50 from 70 countries.

The Global Ageing Survey, directed by George Leeson, explores attitudes, expectations, and behaviours towards later life and retirement. It covers 44,000 people aged 40–80 in 24 countries around the world. It has revealed that many people are now fully aware of the ageing of the world's population and its implications for their lives and those of their children and grandchildren.

Canada has the highest per capita immigration rate in the world, perhaps partly to counter population ageing. However the C. D. Howe Institute, a conservative think tank, has suggested that immigration cannot be used as a viable means to counter population ageing. That conclusion is also seen in the work of other scholars. The demographers Peter McDonald and Rebecca Kippen commented, "As fertility sinks further below replacement level, increasingly higher levels of annual net migration will be required to maintain a target of even zero population growth."

== Around the world ==
Timeline of Countries Entering Super-Aged Society Status (21%+ of the population aged 65+)
1965	Monaco
1966–2005
2006	Japan
2007–2008
2009	Germany
2010
2011	Italy
2012–2013
2014	Greece
2015	Portugal
2016	Finland, Bulgaria
2017
2018	Croatia
2019	Serbia
2020	France, Latvia
2021	Bosnia and Herzegovina, Czechia
2022	San Marino, Slovenia, Estonia, Hungary
2023	Spain, Denmark, Sweden
2024	Austria, Belgium, Liechtenstein, South Korea
2025	Taiwan

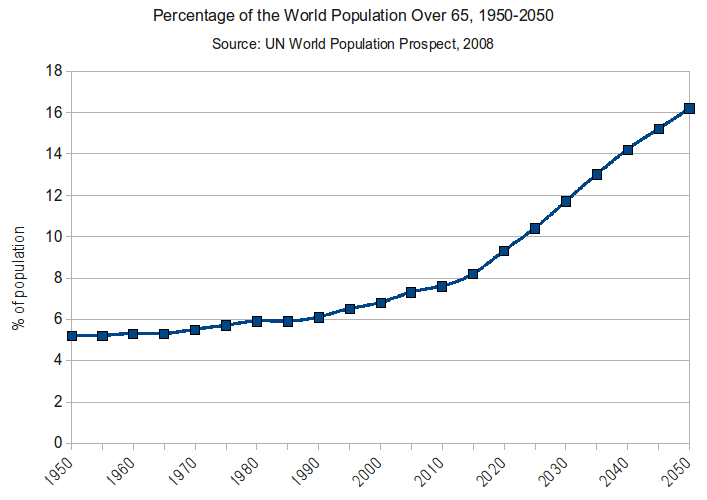
Percentage of world population over 65

The world's older population is growing dramatically. The more developed countries also have older populations as their citizens live longer. Less developed countries have much younger populations. An interactive version of the map is available here. Asia and Africa are the two regions with a significant number of countries facing population ageing. Within 20 years, many countries in those regions will face a situation of the largest population cohort being those over 65 and the average age approaching 50. In 2100, according to research led by the University of Washington, 2.4 billion people will be over the age of 65, compared with 1.7 billion under the age of 20. The Oxford Institute of Population Ageing is an institution looking at global population ageing. Its research reveals that many of the views of global ageing are based on myths and that there will be considerable opportunities for the world as its population matures, as the Institute's director, Professor Sarah Harper, highlighted in her book Ageing Societies.

Most of the developed countries now have sub-replacement fertility levels, and population growth now depends largely on immigration together with population momentum, which also arises from previous large generations now enjoying longer life expectancy.

Of the roughly 150,000 people who die each day across the globe, about two thirds, 100,000 per day, die of age-related causes. In industrialised nations, that proportion is much higher and reaches 90%.

== Economics of ageing ==
The economic effects of an ageing population are considerable. Nowadays, more and more people are paying attention to the economic issues and social policy challenges related to the elderly population. Older people have higher accumulated savings per head than younger people but spend less on consumer goods. Depending on the age ranges at which the changes occur, an ageing population may thus result in lower interest rates and the economic benefits of lower inflation. Some economists in Japan see advantages in such changes, notably the opportunity to progress automation and technological development without causing unemployment, and emphasise a shift from GDP to personal well-being.

However, population ageing also increases some categories of expenditure, including some met from public finances. The largest area of expenditure in many countries is now health care, whose cost is likely to increase dramatically as populations age. This would present governments with hard choices between higher taxes, including a possible reweighing of tax from earnings to consumption and a reduced government role in providing health care.The working population will face greater pressure, and a portion of their taxes will have to be used to pay for healthcare and pensions for the elderly. However, recent studies in some countries demonstrate the dramatic rising costs of health care are more attributable to rising drug and doctor costs and the higher use of diagnostic testing by all age groups, not to the ageing population that is often claimed.

The second-largest expenditure of most governments is education, with expenses that tend to fall with an ageing population, especially as fewer young people would probably continue into tertiary education as they would be in demand as part of the work force.

Prevalence of dementia in OECD countries (per 1000 populations)

Social security systems have also begun to experience problems. Earlier defined-benefit pension systems are experiencing sustainability problems because of the increased longevity. The extension of the pension period was not paired with an extension of the active labour period or a rise in pension contributions, which has resulted in a decline of replacement ratios.

Population ageing also affects workforce. In many countries, the increase in the number of elderly people means the weakening or disappearance of the "demographic dividend", and social resources have to flow more towards elderly people in need of support. The demographic dividend refers to the beneficial impact of a decline in fertility rate on a country's population age structure and economic growth. The older workers would spend more time on work and human capital of an ageing workforce is low, reducing labor productivity.

The expectation of continuing population ageing prompts questions about welfare states' capacity to meet the needs of the population. In the early 2000s, the World Health Organization set up guidelines to encourage "active ageing" and to help local governments address the challenges of an ageing population (Global Age-Friendly Cities) with regard to urbanization, housing, transportation, social participation, health services, etc. Local governments are well positioned to meet the needs of local, smaller populations, but as their resources vary from one to another (e.g. property taxes, the existence of community organizations), the greater responsibility on local governments is likely to increase inequalities. In Canada, the most fortunate and healthier elders tend to live in more prosperous cities offering a wide range of services, but the less fortunate lack access to the same level of resources. Private residences for the elderly also provide many services related to health and social participation (e.g. pharmacy, group activities, and events) on site, but they are not accessible to the less fortunate. Also, the environmental gerontology indicates the importance of the environment in active ageing. In fact, promoting good environments (natural, built, social) in ageing can improve health and quality of life and reduce the problems of disability and dependence, and, in general, social spending and health spending.

An ageing population may provide incentive for technological progress, as some hypothesise the effect of a shrinking workforce may be offset by automation and productivity gains.

== Social policies and intervention ==
In response to the threat of the undesirable consequences associated with an ageing population, many states have adopted preventative policies and initiatives. Because the dominant causes of population ageing are decreased birth rates and increased longevity, preventative action must address these factors. Lengthened lifespans are considered a significant achievement of the modern age, so many countries are instead turning to pronatalist policies with limited success. Other short-term solutions involve augmenting the workforce, either through increased participation rates or immigration, to be able sustain the economy and an ageing native population. However, increasing workforce participation has a ceiling effect, and the efficacy of expanding immigration is subject to much debate.

Meanwhile, countries are instead being encouraged to embrace policy that adjusts to the inevitability of demographic change by promoting and improving infrastructure for "active ageing". Additionally, improving the productivity of the elderly has also become a method to alleviate the problem of social aging. But this first requires increasing their investment in education, and providing suitable job opportunities is equally important.

Generally in West Africa and specifically in Ghana, social policy implications of demographic ageing are multidimensional (such as rural-urban distribution, gender composition, levels of literacy/illiteracy as well as their occupational histories and income security). Current policies on ageing in Ghana seem to be disjointed, and ideas on documents on to improve policies in population ageing have yet to be concretely implemented, perhaps partly because of many arguments that older people are only a small proportion of the population

Global ageing populations seem to cause many countries to be increasing the age for old age security from 60 to 65 to decrease the cost of the scheme of the GDP. Advocates for raising the retirement and pension eligibility ages hope to allocate larger payments during the years the elderly are most vulnerable and in need of assistance. Evidence also suggest that as lifespans lengthen, people remain healthier into older age than in the past, indicating that they may be able to participate in the workforce longer. However, even so, in industrialized countries with the greatest improvement in life expectancy, discussions about continuing to raise the eligibility age for pension benefits have intensified in order to reduce economic burden more significantly.

Age discrimination can be defined as "the systematic and institutionalized denial of the rights of older people on the basis of their age by individuals, groups, organisations, and institutions." Some of the abuse can be a result of ignorance, thoughtlessness, prejudice, and stereotyping. Forms of discrimination are economic accessibility, social accessibility, temporal accessibility and administrative accessibility.

In most countries worldwide, particularly countries in Africa, older people are typically the poorest members of the social spectrum and live below the poverty line.

Moreover, the growing burden of health expenditure has evolved into a social policy and cost management issue, not just a population issue.

== See also ==
- Aging
- Centre of Excellence in Population Ageing Research (CEPAR)
- Demographic transition
- Gerontology
- Human overpopulation
- Human population planning
- Political demography
- Population decline
- Senescence
- The Silver Tsunami
- Sub-replacement fertility
- List of countries and regions by population ages 65 and above
