= Agre =

Agre, agré or AGRE may refer to:

- Agre (surname)
- Agre is the name of one of the dogs in the myth of Actaeon
- Autism Genetic Resource Exchange
