= Agree (surname) =

Agree is a surname. Notable people with the surname include:

- Charles N. Agree (1897–1982), American architect
- Emily Agree, American sociologist

== See also ==
- Agre (surname)
- Isaac Agree Downtown Synagogue, in Detroit, Michigan
