= Agre (surname) =

Agre is a surname. Notable people with the surname include:

- Alexandra Agre (born 1988), American curler
- Bernard Agré (1926–2014), Ivorian archbishop
- Denis Agre (born 1988), Bulgarian basketball player
- Ottar Agre, also known as Ottar E. Akre (1896–1992), Norwegian accordionist
- Peter Agre (born 1949), American physician
- Philip E. Agre, American artificial intelligence researcher and information studies professor
- Sardar Singh Agre, Indian politician

== See also ==
- Agree (surname)
