= Axel Börsch-Supan =

German mathematician and economist

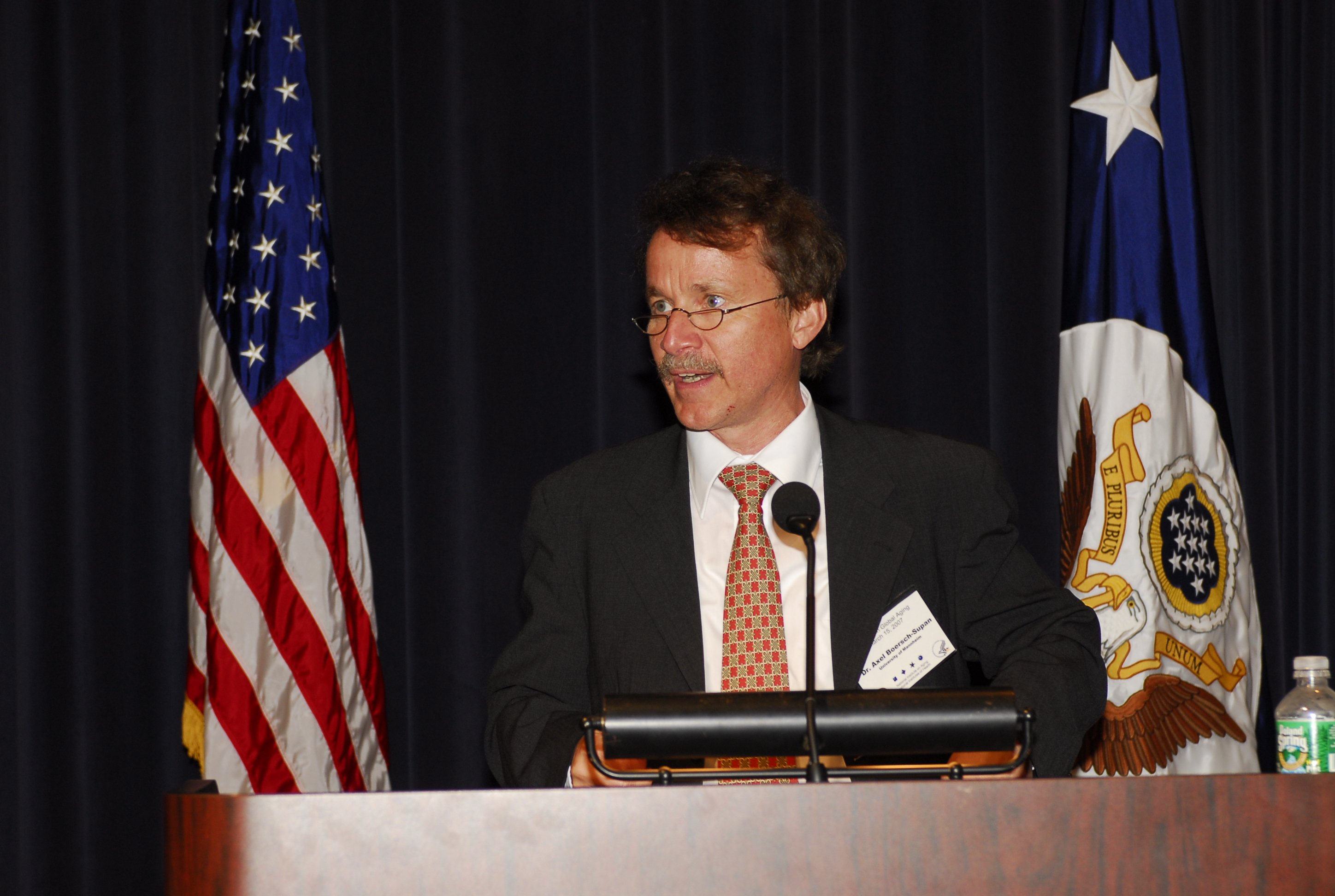
- Born: 28 December 1954 (age 71); Darmstadt, Hesse, Germany
- Education: Massachusetts Institute of Technology
- Scientific career
- Fields: Economics
- Workplaces: Munich Center for the Economics of Aging (MEA); Max Planck Society; Technical University of Munich
- Thesis: Housing Demand in the United States and West Germany

Axel Börsch-Supan (born 28 December 1954 in Darmstadt) is a German researcher, economist and director of the Munich Research Institute for the Economics of Aging and SHARE Analyses (MEA), associated with the Max Planck Institute for Social Law and Social Policy in Munich, Germany. He is Professor emeritus of Economics and Chair for the Economics of Aging at the Technical University of Munich and the founder and long-term Managing Director of SHARE-ERIC (the Survey of Health, Ageing and Retirement in Europe). An important field of his empirical research focuses on socio-political issues that are associated with economic aspects of demographic change and the aging of the population.

== Education and career ==
Axel Börsch-Supan studied mathematics and economics at LMU Munich and the University of Bonn, from which he graduated in 1980, receiving his diploma for his thesis titled Stability and step size control for the solution of parabolic partial differential equations with finite difference methods. In June 1984, he received a doctorate in economics from the Massachusetts Institute of Technology (MIT) in Cambridge, Massachusetts. The topic of his dissertation was Housing Demand in the United States and West Germany: A Discrete Choice Analysis under the supervision of Daniel McFadden.

He was an assistant professor of public policy at Harvard University in 1984-1987, professor of economic theory at the Technical University of Dortmund in 1987-1989, and professor of macroeconomics and public policy at the University of Mannheim in 1989-2011. He founded the Mannheim Research Institute for the Economics of Aging (2001-2011).

From 2011-2022, he was director at the Max Planck Institute for Social Law and Social Policy (MPISOC) in Munich and headed the Munich Center for the Economics of Aging (MEA) as a department of MPISOC. After his retirement at the end of 2022, MEA became a not-for-profit research institute. Additionally, he was Managing Director of the Survey of Health, Ageing and Retirement in Europe (SHARE) from its beginning through 2024.

Börsch-Supan is member of the Berlin-Brandenburg Academy of Sciences and Humanities (BBAW) since 1998 as well as member of the German National Academy of Sciences Leopoldina since 2000. Since 2015, he is also a corresponding member of the Austrian Academy of Sciences.

== Other activities ==
Börsch-Supan is member of the Council of Advisors to the Federal Ministry for Economic Affairs and Energy (chair 2004-08), was a member of the German federal governments’ Commissions on Pension Reform (2003, 2016) and the Expert Group on Demographic Change, the advisory group on demographic change of President Horst Köhler, and the European Statistics Advisory Committee (ESAC). As public policy adviser, he has consulted to several ministries of the German federal and state governments, the European Commission, the World Bank, the OECD and several foreign governments.

== Selected publications ==
- Börsch-Supan, A., Brandt, M., Hunkler, C., Kneip, T., Korbmacher, J., Malter, F., Schaan, B., Stuck, S. and Zuber, S., 2013, Data Resource Profile: The Survey of Health, Ageing and Retirement in Europe (SHARE). International Journal of Epidemiology DOI: 10.1093/ije/dyt088.
- Börsch-Supan, A., Myths, Scientific Evidence and Economic Policy in an Aging World, 2014, Journal of the Economics of Ageing 1:1.
- Börsch-Supan, A., and Morten Schuth, 2014, Early Retirement, Mental Health and Social Networks, In: David A. Wise (ed.), Discoveries in the Economics of Aging, University of Chicago Press, Chicago.
- Börsch-Supan, A., Klaus Härtl and Alexander Ludwig, 2014, Aging in Europe: Reforms, International Diversification and Behavioral Reactions, American Economic Review, P&P, 104 (5): 1-7.
- Börsch-Supan, A., and Matthias Weiss, 2016: Productivity and age: Evidence from work teams at the assembly line, The Journal of the Economics of Ageing, 7: 30-42 .
