= Survey of Health, Ageing and Retirement in Europe =

Survey of Health, Ageing and Retirement in Europe (SHARE)
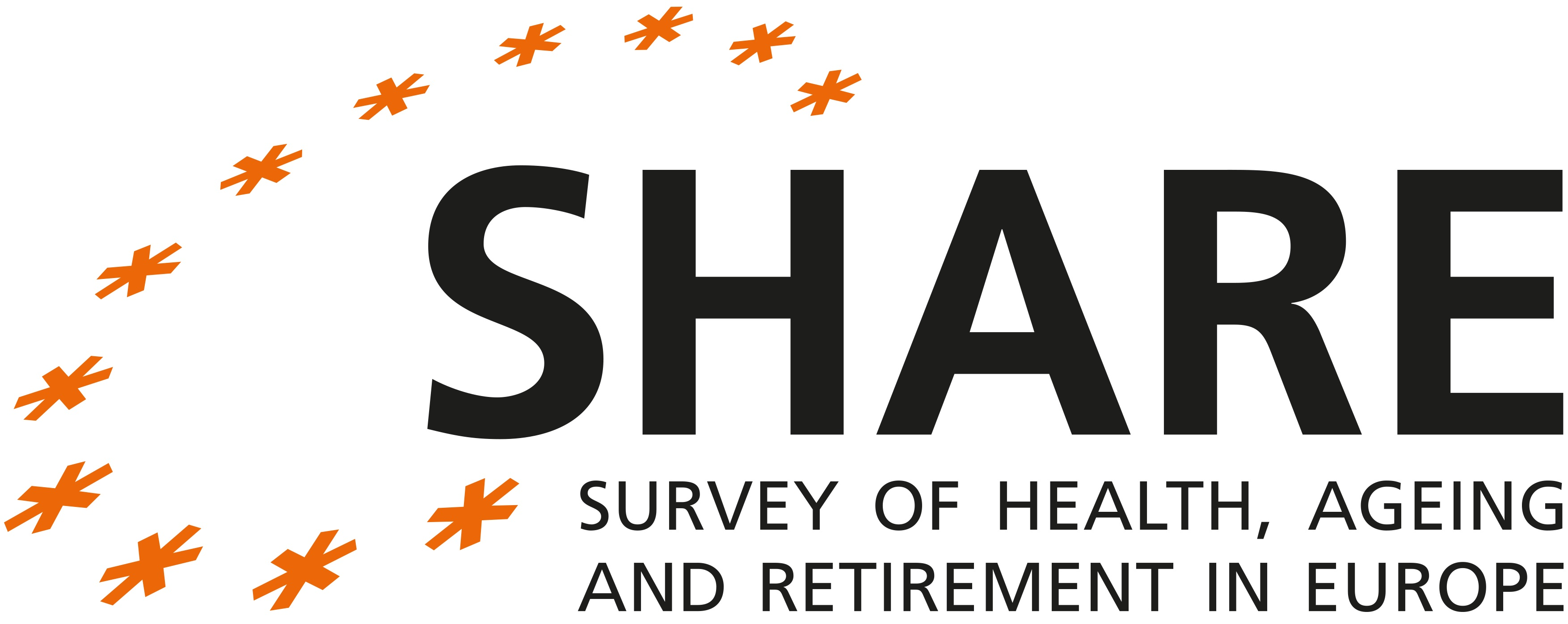
- Coordinating institute: SHARE Berlin Institute
- Location: Chausseestraße 111, 10115 Berlin, Germany
- Website: www.share-eric.eu

The Survey of Health, Ageing and Retirement in Europe (SHARE) is a multidisciplinary and cross-national panel database of micro data on health, socio-economic status, and social and family networksof individuals aged 50 and over. By 2025, SHARE has conducted approximately 616,000 interviews with around 160,000 individuals aged 50 and over. The survey covers 28 European countries and Israel.

SHARE was founded as a response to the European Commission's call to "examine the possibility of establishing, in co-operation with Member States, a European Longitudinal Ageing Survey". It has since become a major pillar of the European Research Area, selected as one of the projects to be implemented in the European Strategy Forum on Research Infrastructures (ESFRI) in 2006 and was given a new legal status as the first ever European Research Infrastructure Consortium (SHARE-ERIC) in March 2011.

== About SHARE ==
Founded in 2002, SHARE is coordinated centrally at the SHARE Berlin Institute and led by Managing Director David Richter. It is a collaborative effort of more than 150 researchers worldwide who are organized in multidisciplinary national teams and cross-national working groups. A Scientific Monitoring Board composed of eminent international researchers and a network of advisors help to maintain and improve the project's high scientific standards.

SHARE is harmonized with its role models and sister studies the U.S. Health and Retirement Study (HRS) and the English Longitudinal Study of Ageing (ELSA), and has the advantage of encompassing cross-national variation in public policy, culture and history across a variety of European countries. Its scientific power is based on its panel design that grasps the dynamic character of the ageing process. SHARE's multi-disciplinary approach delivers a full picture of the ageing process. Procedural guidelines and programs ensure an ex-ante harmonized cross-national design. The collected data include health variables (e.g. self-reported health, health conditions, physical and cognitive functioning, health behaviour, use of health care facilities), biomarkers (e.g. grip strength, body-mass index, peak flow), psychological variables (e.g. psychological health, well-being, life satisfaction), economic variables (current work activity, job characteristics, opportunities to work past retirement age, sources and composition of current income, wealth and consumption, housing, education), and social support variables (e.g. assistance within families, transfers of incomes and assets, social networks, volunteer activities).

SHARE data collection is based on computer-assisted personal interviewing (CAPI) complemented by measurements as well as paper-and-pencil questionnaires. The data are available to the entire research community free of charge.

=== Funding ===
SHARE receives funding from the European Commission, the American National Institute on Aging and national sources, especially the German Federal Ministry of Education and Research and the Deutsche Forschungsgemeinschaft.

== Summary results ==
=== Economic situation, income and retirement ===
The data collected by SHARE provide a detailed insight into the financial situation of households of elderly Europeans. Among other things, the study shows that not in all European countries incomes are sufficient – therefore, poverty in old age is a serious problem in some countries. Income is considered the least sufficient in the Eastern European countries Poland and Czech Republic, in the Southern European countries Greece, Italy, and Spain as well as Israel. In these countries, more than 50 percent of households report difficulties making ends meet with their income. In contrast, income is considered satisfactory especially in Sweden, Denmark, the Netherlands, and Switzerland; there, less than 20 percent of households have problems getting by with their income.

Likewise, patterns of employment and retirement differ significantly between the European countries. The proportion of people with high workloads in the low wage sector is particularly high in Poland and Greece. Accordingly, the proportion of early retirees is above average. In contrast, work quality in regard to the balance between performance and wage is high in the Nordic countries, the Netherlands, and Switzerland. These countries also show the lowest percentage of older employees opting for early retirement.

=== Family ===
Availability of kin support largely depends in general on geographic accessibility and social contact. The SHARE data confirm, on the one hand, the existence of longstanding regional patterns of ‘weak’ and ‘strong’ family ties, while, on the other hand, they reveal many similarities across Europe. In all countries – and across all age groups – 85 percent of all parents have at least one child living at a distance of at most 25 km. Moreover, the share of parents with less than weekly contacts to a child is equally low (7%) in Sweden and in Spain.

These results provide no evidence to support the notion of a ‘decline’ of parent-child relations in ageing Europe at the beginning of the 21st century.

=== Health ===
SHARE data document a strong relationship between education and health among the older population. This holds not only on the individual level (better educated individuals are healthier than less educated) but also across European nations. Comparing average education and average health levels in SHARE countries reveals that in particular the East European and Mediterranean countries are characterized by low levels of education and health simultaneously. In contrast, populations in Northern European countries and Switzerland are both healthier and better educated than the average.

== Research with SHARE data ==
As of July 2019, about 10,000 researchers worldwide use SHARE data for their research. Publications based on SHARE data are documented and published online.

== Waves of data collection ==
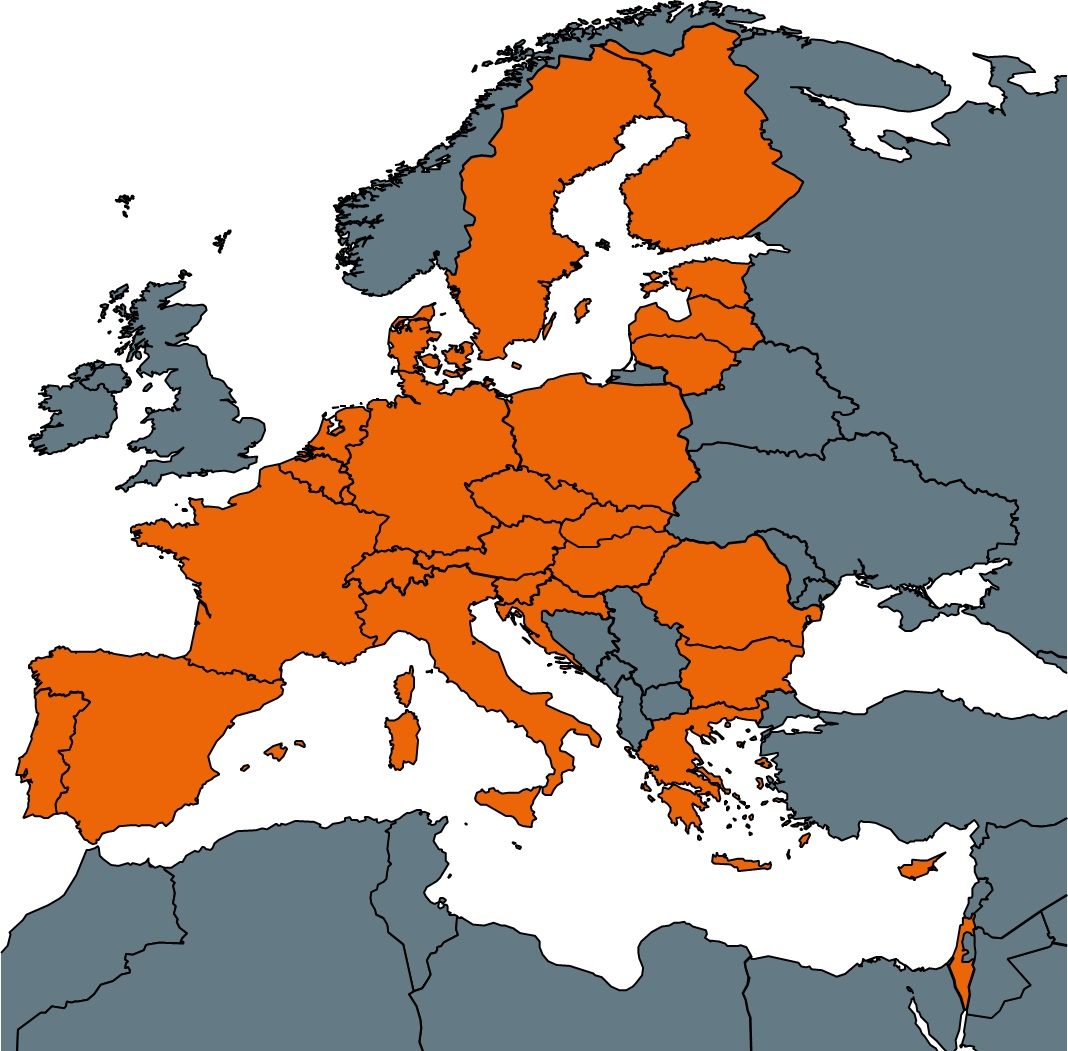
Countries participating in Wave 7 of the SHARE study

By now, nine waves of data collection have been conducted. Further waves are being planned to take place on a biennial basis.

=== Wave 1 (2004) ===
Eleven European countries have contributed data to the 2004 SHARE baseline study. They constitute a balanced representation of the various regions in Europe, ranging from Scandinavia (Denmark and Sweden) through Central Europe (Austria, France, Germany, Switzerland, Belgium, and the Netherlands) to the Mediterranean (Spain, Italy and Greece). Israel joined the SHARE framework in late 2004, being the first country in the Middle East to initiate a systematic study of its aging population. The SHARE main questionnaire consisted of 20 modules on health, socio-economics and social networks. All data were collected by face-to-face, computer-aided personal interviews (CAPI), supplemented by a self-completion paper and pencil questionnaire.

=== Wave 2 (2006–07) ===
Two 'new' EU member states - the Czech Republic and Poland - as well as Ireland joined SHARE in 2006 and participated in the second wave of data collection in 2006–07. In addition to the main questionnaire an ‘End of Life’ interview was conducted for family members of deceased respondents. Israel carried out its second wave in 2009–10.

=== Wave 3 / SHARELIFE (2008–09) ===
SHARELIFE is the third wave of data collection for SHARE, which focuses on people's life histories. 30,000 men and women across 13 European countries took part in this round of the survey. SHARELIFE links individual micro data over the respondents’ entire life with institutional macro data on the welfare state. It thereby allows assessing the full effect of welfare state interventions on the life of the individual. Changes in institutional settings that influence individual decisions are of specific interest to evaluate policies throughout Europe. The SHARELIFE questionnaire contains all important areas of the respondents’ lives, ranging from partners and children over housing and work history to detailed questions on health and health care. With this variety SHARELIFE constitutes a large interdisciplinary dataset for research in the fields of sociology, economics, gerontology, and demography. The SHARELIFE life history data can be linked to the first two waves of SHARE assessing the present living conditions of older Europeans. SHARELIFE was repeated in Wave 7, collecting life-history information from those respondents who had not done a life-history interview in Wave 3.

=== Wave 4 (2010–11) ===
In the fourth wave, which started in autumn 2010, Estonia, Hungary, Luxemburg, Portugal and Slovenia joined the SHARE survey. In the other European countries the national samples were enlarged, and a new social network module was added to the main questionnaire. In the German study, three additional projects including innovative biomarkers (e.g. dried bloodspots), the linkage with the German pension data as well as nonresponse experiments were implemented.

=== Wave 5 (2013) ===
Data collection for Wave 5 took place in 2013. A total of 15 countries participated in this wave, including, for the first time, Luxemburg. Since March 2015 the data is available for research purposes. Wave 5 included additional questions regarding childhood, material deprivation, social exclusion, and migration, as well as information on computer skills and the use of computers at the workplace.

=== Wave 6 (2015) ===
Wave 6 was conducted in 2015 in 17 countries. One of the most important innovations was the collection of objective health measures by means of “Dried Blood Spot Sampling” (DBSS): In 12 countries, a blood samples were collected in order to determine blood levels which are associated with diseases that primarily occur among older people. These include cardiovascular diseases and diseases that can be triggered by external living conditions and environmental factors, such as diabetes mellitus (type 2). These additional biomarkers are expected to be a useful instrument for comparing the objective health status with the subjective perception of the respondents. Moreover, they should help to explain correlations between health and social status and to demonstrate the course of a disease. Wave 6 furthermore captures longitudinal changes in the social networks.

=== Wave 7 (2017) ===
In 2017, the main data collection of Wave 7 took place in 28 countries - full coverage of the EU was achieved by including 8 new countries in SHARE: Finland, Lithuania, Latvia, Slovakia, Romania, Bulgaria, Malta and Cyprus. All respondents who had already taken part in the third wave of SHARE (SHARELIFE) were interviewed about their current situation in terms of family, friends, health as well as social and financial circumstances. For those who had not taken part in SHARELIFE, the Wave 7 questionnaire contained a SHARELIFE module to collect information on their life histories. Wave 7 data was released in April 2019.

=== Wave 8 (2019-20) ===
Fieldwork for the eighth wave of SHARE began in October 2019. In addition to regular interviews, physical activity measurements using sensors were also conducted in a subsample in 10 countries. From the beginning of 2020, the COVID-19 pandemic spread across Europe and affected almost all areas of life, including survey research. SHARE, like other surveys, had to suspend regular face-to-face interviews in March 2020 due to strict epidemiological control measures in the 28 participating countries. This was particularly urgent as SHARE targets the population aged 50 and over, including very old respondents and residents of retirement and nursing homes who are at highest risk of possible infection. As a result, SHARE switched to telephone interviewing and developed a special "SHARE Corona" survey, which was successfully conducted in all 28 countries between April and August 2020.

=== Wave 9 (2021-22) ===
In summer 2021, one year after the first SHARE Corona survey, another telephone survey on the effects of the pandemic was conducted. The face-to-face surveys for the ninth wave were conducted between October 2021 and September 2022 in all 28 SHARE countries. In five countries (Czech Republic, Denmark, France, Germany, Italy), an additional project was carried out to measure the cognitive abilities of respondents (SHARE HCAP).

== Related studies and projects ==
The SHARE-Study is not the only study engaging in these fields of research - it has a number of sister studies all over the world dealing with these subjects like ageing, pensions, retirement and population aging in general. Analogue studies following the SHARE model are for instance The Irish Longitudinal Study on Ageing (TILDA), The Longitudinal Aging Study in India (LASI), The Japanese Study of Aging and Retirement (JSTAR), SHARE Israel, The Korean Longitudinal Study of Aging (KLoSA), Chinese Health and Retirement Survey (CHARLS) and Mexican Health and Aging Study (MHAS).

== Bibliography ==
- Börsch-Supan, A., J. Bristle, K. Andersen-Ranberg, A. Brugiavini, F. Jusot, H. Litwin, G. Weber (Eds.) (2019). Health and Socio-Economic Status over the Life Course. First Results from SHARE Waves 6 and 7. Berlin: De Gruyter.
- Börsch-Supan, A., T. Kneip, H. Litwin, M. Myck and G. Weber (Eds.) (2015). Ageing in Europe - supporting policies for an inclusive society. Berlin: De Gruyter.
- Börsch-Supan, A., M. Brandt, K. Hank, M. Schröder (2011): The Individual and the Welfare State. Life Histories in Europe, Mannheim Research Institute for the Economics of Aging (MEA), University of Mannheim.
- Börsch-Supan, A., K. Hank, H. Jürges, M. Schröder (eds.) (2008): Health, ageing and retirement in Europe (2004–2007). Starting the longitudinal dimension, Mannheim Research Institute for the Economics of Aging (MEA), University of Mannheim.
- Börsch-Supan, A., Brugiavini, A., Jürges, H., Mackenbach, J., Siegrist, J. Weber, G. (eds.) (2005): Health, Ageing and Retirement in Europe – First Results from the Survey of Health, Ageing and Retirement in Europe, Mannheim Research Institute for the Economics of Aging (MEA), University of Mannheim.
- Börsch-Supan, A., Hank, K., Jürges, H. (2005): A New Comprehensive and International View on Ageing: Introducing the Survey of Health, Ageing and Retirement in Europe, European Journal of Ageing (2) 4, 245–253.
- Börsch-Supan, A.; Jürges, H. (eds.) (2005): The Survey of Health, Ageing and Retirement in Europe – Methodology, Mannheim Research Institute for the Economics of Aging (MEA), University of Mannheim.
- Schröder, M. (2010): SHARELIFE Methodology, Mannheim Research Institute for the Economics of Aging, University of Mannheim.
- Malter, F. and A. Börsch-Supan (Eds.) (2017). SHARE Wave 6: Panel innovations and collecting Dried Blood Spots. Munich: Munich Center for the Economics of Aging (MEA).
- Bergmann, M., A. Scherpenzeel and A. Börsch-Supan (Eds.) (2019). SHARE Wave 7 Methodology: Panel Innovations and Life Histories. Munich: Munich Center for the Economics of Aging (MEA).
- Börsch-Supan, Axel; Brandt, Martina; Hunkler, Christian; Kneip, Thorsten; Korbmacher, Julie; Malter, Frederic; Schaan, Barbara; Stuck, Stephanie; Zuber, Sabrina (2013): Data Resource Profile: The Survey of Health, Ageing and Retirement in Europe (SHARE). In: International Journal of Epidemiology, 42 (4), pp. 992–1001.
