= Max Planck Institute for Foreign and International Social Law =

German research institute

The Max Planck Institute for Foreign and International Social Law (German: Max-Planck-Institut für ausländisches und internationales Sozialrecht) was a research institute devoted to the field of foreign and international social law. It was one of the research institutes of the Max Planck Society. It merged with the Munich Center for the Economics of Aging (MEA) to the Max Planck Institute for Social Law and Social Policy in 2011.

The Institute was founded in 1980. It evolved from a project group for international and comparative social law, launched by the Max Planck Society in 1976. Its founding director was Professor Hans F. Zacher.

During its early years, the Institute mainly focused on research on the methodology of comparing social laws. Several studies on the social law systems of other states laid the foundations for comparative social law as a subject of research. Current research focuses on social security law in terms of collectively organized social benefits and services provided by the civil polity (cash benefits, benefits in kind and personal services), on fundamental social rights, and on social constitutional law in selected countries. Comparative law research bears various links to other legal disciplines, most notably private law, commercial law, family law, labour law and fiscal law. The institute also focuses on the field of intergovernmental and international social law, with the chief emphasis placed on bilateral and multilateral social security agreements, above all on developments in supranational European social law.
