= Mexican Health and Aging Study =

The Mexican Health and Aging Study (MHAS), also known by its Spanish name, Estudio Nacional de Salud y Envejecimiento en México, ENASEM, is the first panel study of health and aging in Mexico. The first phase of MHAS (waves 1 and 2) was supported by a grant from the MHAS was supported by a grant from the National Institutes of Health/National Institute on Aging (AG 18016, BJ Soldo, PI). The study was a collaborative effort among researchers from the Universities of Pennsylvania, Maryland, and Wisconsin in the U.S., and the Instituto Nacional de Estadística, Geografia e Informática (INEGI, Mexico).

The second phase of MHAS (waves 3 and 4) is supported by the National Institutes of Health/National Institute on Aging (R01AG018016, R Wong, PI) and by the INEGI in Mexico. The new study is a collaborative effort from the University of Texas Medical Branch (UTMB), Instituto Nacional de Estadística, Geografia e Informática (INEGI, Mexico), the University of Wisconsin, the Instituto Nacional de Geriatría (INGER, Mexico) and the Instituto Nacional de Salud Pública (INSP, Mexico).

== Study goals ==
The overall goal of the study is to examine the aging process and its disease and disability burden in a large representative panel of older Mexicans from a wide socioeconomic spectrum. The MHAS design was motivated by several research questions related to the dynamics of health and aging in Mexico; the effect on the multiple domains of health of early- and mid-life health behaviors, migration, transfers, and socioeconomic status; and health selectivity among migrants to the U.S. and among those returning to Mexico.

== Study description ==
The MHAS includes a nationally representative sample of Mexicans 50 years and older and their spouses of partners regardless of age, and used protocols and survey instruments that are highly comparable to the U.S. Health and Retirement Study (HRS). The baseline survey is a national representative survey of individuals born prior to 1951. The baseline survey was conducted in 2001, and a follow-up visit to the same individuals was conducted in 2003. The sample for the MHAS baseline was selected from residents of both rural and urban areas, from the National Employment survey (Encuesta Nacional de Empleo, ENE), carried out by the INEGI (Instituto Nacional de Estadistica y Geografia) in Mexico; 11,000 households with at least one resident of age 50 or older were eligible to be part of the MHAS baseline sample. The baseline survey was conducted in the summer of 2001 with a sample size of 15,186 respondents. A direct interview was sought with each individual, and proxy interviews obtained when poor health or temporary absence precluded a direct interview. A follow-up survey was carried out in the summer of 2003; all age-eligible subjects from the 2001 wave were targeted even if they had moved. If the subject had died, an interview was conducted with an informed respondent. New spouses of respondents from 2001 were interviewed and included in the 2003 follow-up study, for a total of 14,250 interviews including 546 next-of-kin interviews.

A follow-up visit was completed in 2012. In addition to a follow-up of the 2001 and 2003 respondents, the sample was refreshed by adding a representative sample of the population from the 1952-1962 birth cohorts, as well as their spouses/partners regardless of age. Similar to the baseline interview, the sampling frame for the new cohort sample was the Mexican National Employment and Occupation Survey (ENOE, previously named National Employment Survey, ENE) 2012. During the 2012 survey, 18,465 interviews were completed, including 2,742 next-of-kin interviews. The survey was conducted using a new CAPI (Computer Assisted Personal Interview) system. Also new to the third wave of the study was the collection of a blood sample for biomarkers from a sub-sample (n=2,089) and questions on the occurrence of major life events of the respondents.

The MHAS is a high quality study, with excellent response and follow-up rates. Response rates for waves in 2001, 2003 and 2012 were 91.8%, 93.3% and 88.1%, respectively. The next wave of the study is planned to be fielded in 2015.

== Study website ==
The study website has a user-friendly environment that was designed to enhance the usability of and access to MHAS survey data and documentation. The platform is in both English (www.MHASweb.org and Spanish (www.ENASEM.org). Databases and study documents can be accessed from the website and include:

• Questionnaires • Interviewer and Coder Manuals • Codebooks with variable codes and frequencies • Follow-up master file to link study subjects through the three waves • Fieldwork reports: duration of interviews, response rates

The website also features a searchable database of publications using MHAS data and a discussion forum available to all users. The discussion forum can be used to facilitate research collaborations and share knowledge among users, including codes for constructing common variables. The database of publications is a non-exhaustive compilation of peer-reviewed publications, working papers, and other research documents using MHAS data.

== Survey contents ==
Health Measures: Self-reports of conditions, symptoms, functional status, lifestyle behaviors (e.g., smoking and drinking history), use/source/costs of health care services, depression, pain, reading and cognitive performance tests;

Background: Childhood health and living conditions, education, ability to read/write and count, migration history, marital history;

Family: Rosters of all children (including deceased children); for each, demographic attributes, summary indicators of childhood and current health, education, current work status, migration. Parent and sibling migration experiences;

Transfers: Financial and time help given to and received by respondent from children, indexed to specific child; time and financial help to parent;

Economic: Sources and amounts of income, including wages, pensions, and government subsidies; type and value of assets. All non-response in amount questions were followed by bracketed amounts to reduce non-response;

Housing Environment: Type, location, building materials, other indicators of quality, and ownership of consumer durables;

Anthropometric: Interviewers measured weight, height; waist, hip, and calf circumference, knee length, and timed one-leg stands for a random subsample (20%) of respondents.

Biomarkers (included in 2012): C-reactive protein, total cholesterol, high-density lipoprotein (HDL), thyroid-stimulating hormone (TSH), vitamin D, hemoglobin, HbAlc (using Ac1 Now);

Performance Measures (included in 2012): Walking speed, grip strength, and balance.

== Publications ==
Publications using the MHAS data cover a broad range of disciplines, including demography, microeconomics, labor economics, public health, epidemiology and health care policy. Published papers have appeared in diverse peer reviewed journals of multiple disciplines related to aging and health, both in the U.S. and abroad.

A list of publications and research projects related to the MHAS 2001 and 2003 can be found at www.MHASweb.org.

== Selected publications ==
- González-González, C., Samper-Ternent, R., Wong, R., & Palloni, A. (2014). Mortality inequality among older adults in Mexico: The combined role of infectious and chronic diseases. Revista Panamericana de Salud Pública, 35(2), 89-95.
- Aguila, E., & Zissimopoulos, J. (2013). Retirement and health benefits for Mexican migrant workers returning from the United States. International Social Security Review, 66(2), 101-125.
- Beltrán-Sánchez, H., & Andrade, F. C. (2013). Educational and sex differentials in life expectancies and disability-free life expectancies in São Paulo, Brazil, and urban areas in Mexico. Journal of Aging and Health, 25(5), 815-838.
- Palloni, A., & Souza, L. (2013). The fragility of the future and the tug of the past: Longevity in Latin America and the Caribbean. Demographic Research, 29, 543-578.
- Palloni, A., & Thomas, J. R. (2013). Estimation of covariate effects with current status data and differential mortality. Demography, 50(2), 521-544.
- Riosmena, F., Wong, R., & Palloni, A. (2013). Migration selection, protection, and acculturation in health: A binational perspective on older adults. Demography, 50(3), 1039-1064.
- Torres, J. M., & Wong, R. (2013). Childhood poverty and depressive symptoms for older adults in Mexico: A life-course analysis. Journal of Cross-Cultural Gerontology 28(3), 317-337.
- Riosmena, F., González-González, C., & Wong, R. (2012). Recent returns from the United States: Health, wellbeing and vulnerability of older adults. Coyuntura Demográfica, 23(7), 1019-1026.
- Samper-Ternent, R., Michaels-Obregon, A., Wong, R., & Palloni, A. (2012). Older adults under a mixed regime of infectious and chronic diseases. Salud Pública de México, 54(4), 487-495.
- Skirbekk, V., Loichinger, E., & Weber, D. (2012). Variation in cognitive functioning as a refined approach to comparing aging across countries. Proceedings of the National Academy of Sciences, 109(3), 770-774.
- Gerst, K., Michaels-Obregon, A., & Wong, R. (2011). The impact of physical activity on disability incidence among older adults in Mexico and the United States. Journal of Aging Research, 2011, 1-10.
- Andrade, F. C. (2010). Measuring the impact of diabetes on life expectancy and disability-free life expectancy among older adults in Mexico. The Journals of Gerontology Series B: Psychological Sciences and Social Sciences, 65(3), 381-389.
- Angel, R. J., Angel, J. L., & Hill, T. D. (2009). Subjective Control and Health among Mexican-Origin Elders in Mexico and the United States: Structural Considerations in Comparative Research. The Journals of Gerontology Series B: Psychological Sciences and Social Sciences, 64B(3), 390-401.
- Monteverde, M., Noronha, K., & Palloni, A. (2009). Effect of early conditions on disability among the elderly in Latin America and the Caribbean. Population Studies, 63(1), 21-35.
- Wong, R., & Palloni, A. (2009). Aging in Mexico and Latin America. In P. Uhlenberg (ed.), International handbook of population aging (pp. 231–252). Netherlands: Springer.
- Angel, R. J., Angel, J. L., & Hill, T. D. (2008). A comparison of the health of older Hispanics in the United States and Mexico - Methodological challenges. Journal of Aging and Health, 20(1), 3-31.
- Salinas, J. J., Eschbach, K. A., & Markides, K. S. (2008). The prevalence of hypertension in older Mexicans and Mexican Americans. Ethnicity and Disease, 18(3), 294-298.
- van Gameren, E. (2008). Labor force participation of Mexican elderly: The importance of health. Estudios Económicos, 23(1), 89-127.
- Wong, R., Ofstedal, M. B., Yount, K., & Agree, E. M. (2008). Unhealthy lifestyles among older adults: Exploring transitions in Mexico and the US. European Journal of Ageing, 5(4), 311-326.
- Dorantes-Mendoza, G., Avila-Funes, J. A., Mejía-Arango, S., & Gutiérrez-Robledo, L. M. (2007). Factors associated with functional dependence in older adults: A secondary analysis of the National Study on Health and Aging, Mexico, 2001 {original in Spanish}. Revista Panamericana de Salud Pública, 22(1), 1-11.
- Ham-Chande, R. & Gutiérrez-Robledo, L. (Eds.). (2007). Salud y Envejecimiento en el Siglo XX. [Health and aging in the 20th century]. Salud Pública de México, 49(Supplement 4).

Ruiz-Pantoja, T. E., & Ham-Chande, R. (2007). Childhood health and social factors associated to elderly morbidity {original in Spanish}. Salud Pública de México, 49(Suppl. 4), 495-504.

- Wong, R., Palloni, A., & Soldo, B. J. (2007). Wealth in middle and old age in Mexico: The role of international migration. International Migration Review, 41(1), 127-151.
- Montes de Oca, V., & Hebrero-Martínez, M. (2006). Turning points and advanced family cycles: Aging effect in Mexican homes. Papeles de Población, 50, 97-116.
- Wong, R., Pelaez, M., Palloni, A., & Markides, K. (2006). Survey Data for the Study of Aging in Latin America and the Caribbean: Selected Studies. Journal of Aging and Health, 18(2), 157-179.
- Crimmins, E. M., Soldo, B. J., Kim, J. K., & Alley, D. E. (2005). Using anthropometric indicators for Mexicans in the United States and Mexico to understand the selection of migrants and the "Hispanic paradox”. Social Biology, 52(3-4), 164-177.
- Palloni, A., & Arias, E. (2004). Paradox lost: Explaining the Hispanic adult mortality advantage. Demography, 41(3), 385-415.
