= The Irish Longitudinal Study on Ageing =

Large study of ageing in Ireland

The Irish Longitudinal Study on Ageing (TILDA) is a nationally representative longitudinal study of the population of Ireland aged 50 and above. TILDA aims to understand the health, social and financial circumstances of the older Irish population and how these factors interact. The study is led by Trinity College Dublin (TCD) in collaboration with a majority of the other principal academic institutions in Ireland. A wide range of experts from many disciplines have been involved from the outset in the development and execution of this study.

== Study design ==
The respondents for the TILDA study were derived from a nationally representative study of the population of Ireland aged 50 years and over. 8500 people were interviewed for Wave 1 of the study. This involved a Computer-Assisted Personal Interview (CAPI), a Health Assessment and a Self Completion Questionnaire. The Health Assessment involved cognitive, gait and cardiovascular tests, as well as procedure to measure macular degeneration. This Health Assessment was carried out in TILDA health centres in Dublin and Cork. A health assessment will be performed in Waves 1, 3 and 5. The CAPI and the SCQ will be performed in all waves.

== Data collection ==
The first wave of data collection was conducted between October 2009 and July 2011. The second wave of data collection began in January 2012, and was scheduled to be completed in December 2012.

== Related studies ==
TILDA is designed to maximise comparability with other well-established international longitudinal studies, in particular Health and Retirement Study (HRS) in the US, the Survey of Health, Ageing and Retirement in Europe (SHARE), and the English Longitudinal Study of Ageing (ELSA), and thereby to facilitate cross-country comparisons.

- English Longitudinal Study of Ageing (ELSA)
- Health and Retirement Study (HRS) in the United States
- Survey of Health, Ageing and Retirement in Europe (SHARE)
