= F. Thomas Juster =

American economist

Francis Thomas Joiner
- Born: August 17, 1926 (age 100); Hollis, Queens, New York
- Died: July 21, 2010 (aged 83); Ann Arbor, Michigan
- Spouse: Marie Juster

Academic background
- Education: Rutgers University (B.S., 1949); Columbia University (Ph.D., 1956)

Academic work
- Discipline: Socioeconomics
- Institutions: University of Michigan
- Awards: Fellow of the American Statistical Association and the National Association for Business Economics
- Website: Information at IDEAS / RePEc

Francis Thomas Juster (August 17, 1926, in Hollis, New York – July 21, 2010, in Ann Arbor, Michigan) was an American economist known for researching household savings, wealth and time use. He was the founding director of both the landmark Health and Retirement Study and of its companion study, the Asset and Health Dynamics Among the Oldest Old (AHEAD).

== Career ==
Juster worked at the Central Intelligence Agency as a senior research analyst from 1951 to 1953. He then joined the faculty of Amherst College, where he taught as an assistant professor from 1953 to 1959. From 1959 to 1973, he was a researcher at the National Bureau of Economic Research. He was a professor at the University of Michigan and a research scientist at the Institute for Social Research's Survey Research Center from 1973 to 1996. He directed the Institute for Social Research from 1976 to 1986. In 1996, he retired from the University of Michigan, whereupon the university named him an emeritus professor. From 2001 to 2002, he was acting director of the Michigan Retirement Research Center.
