= SHARE Israel =

SHARE-Israel is the Israeli component of the Survey of Health, Ageing and Retirement in Europe, a multidisciplinary and cross-national panel database of micro data on health, socio-economic status as well as social and family networks of individuals aged 50 or over.

== About SHARE-Israel ==
Israel joined the SHARE framework in 2004, being the first country in the Middle East to initiate a systematic study of its aging population. SHARE-Israel encompasses two waves of data collected thus far. All SHARE data, including the Israeli component, are available to the entire research community free of charge, and can be obtained through the SHARE website or the National Archive of Computerized Data on Aging.

SHARE-Israel is coordinated by the Israel Gerontological Data Center (IGDC), at the Hebrew University of Jerusalem. The Israel Gerontological Data Center was established with funds from the Ministry of Science and Technology, and is supported by the Ministry for Senior Citizens. SHARE-Israel is directed by Prof. Howard Litwin, with assistance from a multidisciplinary team of expert consultants from the United States, Europe and Israel.

== The instrument ==
The survey instrument addresses demographic details, physical health, grip strength, walking speed, behavioral risks, cognitive function, mental health, health care, employment and pensions, children, social support, financial transfers, housing, household income, consumption, assets and future expectations. In addition, the Israeli questionnaire includes two domains not yet addressed in SHARE:

- Measure of life-long trauma. Respondents were asked to indicate difficult life events that they experienced and the degree to which they were affected by them. Respondents also reported their personal experiences during the Holocaust.
- Examination of reactions to pension reform. This section addresses awareness of forthcoming delays in the age of eligibility for retirement pension in Israel, and respondents` preparations towards it.

== Data collection ==
In order to obtain a representative sample of Israelis aged 50 or over, Israel's population was divided into three sections:

- Jewish-Israelis who immigrated to Israel before 1989 or were born in Israel, and were interviewed in the Hebrew language
- Arab citizens of Israel, interviewed in the Arabic language
- Immigrants of the Russian immigration to Israel in the 1990s, interviewed in the Russian language.

=== Wave 1 ===
Executed in Israel in 2005–2006, the first wave encompassed 2,598 respondents residing in 1,771 households.

=== Wave 2 ===
Executed in Israel in 2009–2010, the second wave encompassed 2,464 respondents.

=== Wave 3 ===
Data has been collected during 2013, and the results will be published around March 2015.

== Results ==
The Israel Gerontological Data Center holds an up-to-date list of all publications based on SHARE-Israel results.

== Funding ==
SHARE-Israel has been supported by:

- The National Insurance Institute of Israel
- The Ministry of Science and Technology
- The Ministry for Senior Citizens
- The 7th Framework Programmes for Research and Technological Development of the European Union
- The US National Institute on Aging
- The German-Israeli Foundation for Scientific Research and Development
