= List of countries by age structure =

The following list of countries by age structure sorts the countries of the world according to the age distribution of their population. The population is divided into three groups:

- Ages 0 to 14 years: children.
- Ages 15 to 65 years: working population or adults.
- Over the age of 65: elderly, senior citizens.

The age structure of a country has a strong impact on society and the economy. If the proportion of 0–14-year-olds is very high, there may be a so-called youth bulge. If, on the other hand, the proportion of over 65 is very high, the social systems of a country can be heavily burdened.

== List ==
All numbers are for the year 2024. Source is The World Factbook.

| Country | % of population by age | | |
| Country | 0 to 14 | 15 to 64 | 65+ |
|---|---|---|---|
| Abkhazia | 18.8% | 65.5% | 15.7% |
| Afghanistan | 40% | 56.1% | 2.4% |
| Albania | 18% | 66.9% | 15.1% |
| Algeria | 30.8% | 62.3% | 6.9% |
| American Samoa | 25.3% | 66% | 8.7% |
| Andorra | 12% | 67.7% | 20.4% |
| Angola | 46.9% | 50.7% | 2.4% |
| Anguilla | 20.8% | 67.5% | 11.7% |
| Antigua and Barbuda | 21.8% | 67.6% | 10.5% |
| Argentina | 23.3% | 63.9% | 12.8% |
| Armenia | 17.7% | 67% | 15.3% |
| Aruba (Netherlands) | 17.2% | 65.7% | 17.1% |
| Australia | 18.3% | 64.7% | 17% |
| Austria | 14.1% | 64.7% | 21.2% |
| Azerbaijan | 22.3% | 68.7% | 9% |
| Bahamas | 21.4% | 70% | 8.6% |
| Bahrain | 18.1% | 77.7% | 4.3% |
| Bangladesh | 25.1% | 67.1% | 7.8% |
| Barbados | 16.6% | 67% | 16.3% |
| Belarus | 16.1% | 66.1% | 17.8% |
| Belgium | 16.9% | 62.8% | 20.2% |
| Belize | 27.7% | 66.7% | 5.5% |
| Benin | 45.3% | 52.2% | 2.5% |
| Bermuda | 16.4% | 60.9% | 22.7% |
| Bhutan | 23.1% | 70.2% | 6.7% |
| Bolivia | 28.5% | 64.5% | 7% |
| Bosnia and Herzegovina | 13.1% | 68.3% | 18.6% |
| Botswana | 28.7% | 65.2% | 6.1% |
| Brazil | 19.6% | 69.5% | 10.9% |
| British Virgin Islands | 16.6% | 71.3% | 12.1% |
| Brunei | 21.7% | 70.8% | 7.5% |
| Bulgaria | 13.8% | 65.2% | 21% |
| Burkina Faso | 41.6% | 55.1% | 3.2% |
| Burundi | 42.3% | 54.4% | 3.4% |
| Cape Verde | 26.4% | 67.2% | 6.4% |
| Cambodia | 28.9% | 65.8% | 5.3% |
| Cameroon | 41.5% | 55.3% | 3.2% |
| Canada | 15.5% | 63.4% | 21% |
| Cayman Islands | 17.4% | 65.9% | 16.7% |
| Central African Republic | 38.5% | 58% | 3.5% |
| Chad | 45.8% | 51.7% | 2.5% |
| Chile | 19.2% | 67.3% | 13.6% |
| China | 16.3% | 69.3% | 14.4% |
| Colombia | 22.3% | 66.5% | 11.2% |
| Comoros | 32.6% | 62.8% | 4.6% |
| Democratic Republic of the Congo | 45.7% | 51.8% | 2.5% |
| Republic of the Congo | 37.8% | 57.8% | 4.3% |
| Cook Islands | 18.2% | 65.9% | 16% |
| Costa Rica | 18.8% | 70.2% | 11.1% |
| Croatia | 13.8% | 63.1% | 23.1% |
| Cuba | 16.3% | 66.5% | 17.2% |
| Curaçao | 19.2% | 62.3% | 18.5% |
| Cyprus | 15.6% | 70% | 14.4% |
| Czech Republic | 15.7% | 63.8% | 20.5% |
| Denmark | 16.2% | 62.9% | 20.8% |
| Djibouti | 28.4% | 67.4% | 4.2% |
| Dominica | 20.7% | 65.6% | 13.7% |
| Dominican Republic | 25.5% | 66.9% | 7.6% |
| Ecuador | 26.8% | 64.1% | 9.1% |
| Egypt | 33.8% | 60.6% | 5.6% |
| El Salvador | 25.3% | 66.3% | 8.4% |
| Equatorial Guinea | 35.6% | 59.4% | 5% |
| Eritrea | 35.7% | 60.3% | 4% |
| Estonia | 15.2% | 62.2% | 22.6% |
| Eswatini (Swaziland) | 31.6% | 64.3% | 4% |
| Ethiopia | 38.7% | 58% | 3.4% |
| Faroe Islands | 20% | 61.5% | 18.5% |
| Fiji | 24.7% | 66.4% | 8.9% |
| Finland | 16.2% | 60.3% | 23.5% |
| France | 17.3% | 60.7% | 22% |
| French Polynesia | 20.3% | 68.7% | 11% |
| French Guiana | 31% | 69% | 24.96% |
| Gabon | 34.6% | 61.1% | 4.3% |
| Gambia | 38.2% | 58.1% | 3.7% |
| Gaza Strip | 38.8% | 58.3% | 2.9% |
| Georgia | 20.6% | 62.7% | 16.7% |
| Germany | 13.8% | 62.5% | 23.7% |
| Ghana | 37.4% | 58.2% | 4.4% |
| Gibraltar | 20% | 62.5% | 17.5% |
| Greece | 13.8% | 62.6% | 23.6% |
| Greenland | 20.4% | 67.1% | 12.5% |
| Grenada | 21.9% | 65.3% | 12.8% |
| Guam (US) | 26.4% | 62.7% | 10.9% |
| Guatemala | 31.5% | 63.2% | 5.4% |
| Guernsey | 14.3% | 64.1% | 21.5% |
| Guinea | 40.9% | 55.1% | 4% |
| Guinea-Bissau | 42.3% | 54.6% | 3.1% |
| Guyana | 23.5% | 68.4% | 8.1% |
| Haiti | 30.5% | 65.3% | 4.2% |
| Honduras | 28.7% | 65.7% | 5.6% |
| Hong Kong | 13.2% | 64.8% | 21.9% |
| Hungary | 14.6% | 63.9% | 21.5% |
| Iceland | 19.8% | 63.2% | 17.1% |
| India | 24.5% | 68.7% | 6.8% |
| Indonesia | 23.8% | 68.3% | 8% |
| Iran | 23.3% | 69.8% | 7% |
| Iraq | 34.6% | 61.7% | 3.6% |
| Ireland | 18.6% | 65.5% | 15.8% |
| Isle of Man | 16% | 61.9% | 22.1% |
| Israel | 27.5% | 60.3% | 12.3% |
| Italy | 11.9% | 64.5% | 23.6% |
| Ivory Coast | 36.1% | 60.9% | 3% |
| Jamaica | 23.8% | 65.7% | 10.4% |
| Japan | 12.1% | 58.4% | 29.5% |
| Jersey | 17% | 64.6% | 18.3% |
| Jordan | 30.9% | 64.9% | 4.2% |
| Kazakhstan | 27.6% | 62.8% | 9.6% |
| Kenya | 35.8% | 60.9% | 3.4% |
| Kiribati | 26.8% | 67.9% | 5.4% |
| North Korea | 19.9% | 68.9% | 11.2% |
| South Korea | 11.3% | 69.4% | 19.3% |
| Kosovo | 22.7% | 68.9% | 8.4% |
| Kuwait | 23% | 73.4% | 3.6% |
| Kyrgyzstan | 29.1% | 64% | 6.9% |
| Laos | 30.1% | 65% | 4.8% |
| Latvia | 14.7% | 63% | 22.2% |
| Lebanon | 18.9% | 71.6% | 9.5% |
| Lesotho | 32% | 62.7% | 5.4% |
| Liberia | 38.9% | 57.9% | 3.2% |
| Libya | 32.3% | 63.2% | 4.6% |
| Liechtenstein | 15.3% | 63.9% | 20.8% |
| Lithuania | 15.2% | 62.6% | 22.2% |
| Luxembourg | 16.7% | 67.1% | 16.1% |
| Macau | 14.4% | 69.9% | 15.7% |
| Madagascar | 37% | 59.1% | 3.9% |
| Malawi | 37.7% | 58.4% | 3.9% |
| Malaysia | 22.2% | 69.4% | 8.4% |
| Maldives | 22.4% | 71.5% | 6.1% |
| Mali | 46.8% | 50.1% | 3.1% |
| Malta | 14.5% | 62.4% | 23.1% |
| Marshall Islands | 30% | 64.3% | 5.7% |
| Mauritania | 35.7% | 59.9% | 4.4% |
| Mauritius | 15.1% | 71% | 13.9% |
| Mexico | 23.3% | 68.6% | 8.2% |
| Federated States of Micronesia | 27% | 67.3% | 5.7% |
| Moldova | 14.8% | 70.2% | 15% |
| Monaco | 9.1% | 53.8% | 37.1% |
| Mongolia | 25.7% | 68.4% | 5.9% |
| Montenegro | 17.7% | 64.4% | 17.9% |
| Montserrat | 15.8% | 76.1% | 8% |
| Morocco | 25.7% | 65.9% | 8.4% |
| Mozambique | 44.7% | 52.4% | 2.9% |
| Myanmar | 24.4% | 68.5% | 7.1% |
| Namibia | 34.1% | 62% | 3.9% |
| Nauru | 29.6% | 66% | 4.4% |
| Nepal | 25.8% | 67.8% | 6.4% |
| Netherlands | 15.2% | 64.1% | 20.7% |
| New Caledonia | 20.7% | 68.4% | 10.8% |
| New Zealand | 19% | 64.2% | 16.9% |
| Nicaragua | 25.1% | 68.9% | 6% |
| Niger | 49.5% | 47.8% | 2.7% |
| Nigeria | 40.4% | 56.2% | 3.4% |
| North Macedonia | 16% | 68.4% | 15.6% |
| Northern Mariana Islands | 22.1% | 67.7% | 10.2% |
| Norway | 16.3% | 64.5% | 19.1% |
| Oman | 29.8% | 66.2% | 4% |
| Pakistan | 34.4% | 60.7% | 4.9% |
| Palau | 17.5% | 71.3% | 11.2% |
| Panama | 25% | 64.8% | 10.1% |
| Papua New Guinea | 37.1% | 58.9% | 4% |
| Paraguay | 22.2% | 68.4% | 9.4% |
| Peru | 25.8% | 66.2% | 8% |
| Philippines | 30.2% | 64.3% | 5.6% |
| Poland | 14.2% | 65.9% | 19.8% |
| Portugal | 12.7% | 65% | 22.3% |
| Puerto Rico (US) | 12.5% | 62.6% | 24.9% |
| Qatar | 13.1% | 85.4% | 1.5% |
| Romania | 15.4% | 62% | 22.6% |
| Russia | 16.5% | 65.7% | 17.8% |
| Rwanda | 37.2% | 59.7% | 3.1% |
| Saint Barthelemy | 13.9% | 63.1% | 23% |
| Saint Helena, Ascension, and Tristan da Cunha | 14.3% | 66.5% | 19.2% |
| Saint Kitts and Nevis | 19.2% | 68.1% | 12.7% |
| Saint Lucia | 17.9% | 66.7% | 15.4% |
| Saint Martin | 24.7% | 64.5% | 10.8% |
| Saint Pierre and Miquelon | 13.1% | 61.6% | 25.3% |
| Saint Vincent and the Grenadines | 18.8% | 68.2% | 13% |
| Samoa | 26.9% | 65.9% | 7.2% |
| San Marino | 14.2% | 64.3% | 21.5% |
| São Tomé and Príncipe | 36.4% | 60.3% | 3.2% |
| Saudi Arabia | 22.9% | 72.7% | 4.4% |
| Senegal | 40.7% | 55.9% | 3.4% |
| Serbia | 14.4% | 65.6% | 20% |
| Seychelles | 17.7% | 72.4% | 10% |
| Sierra Leone | 40.1% | 57.4% | 2.5% |
| Singapore | 14.6% | 71.1% | 14.3% |
| Sint Maarten | 18.4% | 66.3% | 15.2% |
| Slovakia | 15.3% | 66.5% | 18.1% |
| Slovenia | 14.3% | 62.5% | 23.2% |
| Solomon Islands | 30.6% | 64.2% | 5.3% |
| Somalia | 41.4% | 55.8% | 2.8% |
| South Africa | 27.2% | 65.3% | 7.5% |
| South Sudan | 42.1% | 55.3% | 2.6% |
| Spain | 13% | 66.1% | 20.9% |
| Sri Lanka | 22.6% | 65% | 12.4% |
| Sudan | 40.1% | 56.7% | 3.2% |
| Suriname | 22.5% | 70% | 7.5% |
| Sweden | 17.1% | 62.1% | 20.8% |
| Switzerland | 15.1% | 64.6% | 20.3% |
| Syria | 33% | 62.8% | 4.2% |
| Taiwan | 12.1% | 69% | 18.8% |
| Tajikistan | 36.9% | 59.3% | 3.9% |
| Tanzania | 41.2% | 55.4% | 3.4% |
| Thailand | 15.8% | 69% | 15.1% |
| Timor-Leste | 38.7% | 56.8% | 4.5% |
| Togo | 38.7% | 57% | 4.3% |
| Tonga | 29.3% | 63.2% | 7.4% |
| Trinidad and Tobago | 18.7% | 67.2% | 14.1% |
| Tunisia | 24.4% | 65.2% | 10.4% |
| Turkey | 21.7% | 68.6% | 9.6% |
| Turkmenistan | 24.5% | 68.6% | 6.9% |
| Turks and Caicos Islands | 20.4% | 73.2% | 6.4% |
| Tuvalu | 29.2% | 63.2% | 7.6% |
| Uganda | 47% | 50.6% | 2.4% |
| Ukraine | 12.3% | 67.8% | 19.9% |
| United Arab Emirates | 16.4% | 81.4% | 2.2% |
| United Kingdom | 16.7% | 63.9% | 19.3% |
| United States | 18.1% | 63.4% | 18.5% |
| Uruguay | 18.9% | 65.4% | 15.7% |
| Uzbekistan | 29.6% | 63.7% | 6.7% |
| Vanuatu | 31.1% | 63.8% | 5% |
| Venezuela | 25% | 65.9% | 9.1% |
| Vietnam | 23.2% | 68.5% | 8.3% |
| US Virgin Islands (US) | 18.7% | 59.8% | 21.5% |
| Wallis and Futuna | 19.8% | 67.5% | 12.7% |
| West Bank | 36.7% | 59.5% | 3.9% |
| Yemen | 34.4% | 62.2% | 3.4% |
| Zambia | 42.1% | 55.1% | 2.8% |
| Zimbabwe | 38.3% | 57.8% | 3.9% |
| World | 24.5% | 65.2% | 10.3% |

== Visual statistic ==
- Visualization based on data above
