= Sardar Singh Agre =

Indian politician

Sardar Singh is an Indian politician. In 2001 he was minister of family welfare for Uttar Pradesh.
