= English Longitudinal Study of Ageing =

Study on aging of human

The English Longitudinal Study of Ageing (ELSA) is a longitudinal study that collects multidisciplinary data from a representative sample of the English population aged 50 and older to look at all aspects of aging in England.

The study started in 2002 and there are currently eleven waves of completed data. The survey data are designed to be used for the investigation of a broad set of topics relevant to understanding the ageing process. Both objective and subjective data are collected covering themes such as health trajectories, disability and healthy life expectancy, the determinants of economic position in older age; the links between economic position, physical health, cognition and mental health; the nature and timing of retirement and post-retirement, labour market activity; household and family structure, social networks and social supports; patterns, determinants and consequences of social, civic and cultural participation and predictors of well-being.

ELSA is led by Professor Andrew Steptoe and is jointly run by teams at University College London (UCL), the Institute for Fiscal Studies (IFS), National Centre for Social Research, University of Manchester and the University of East Anglia.

== Funding ==
ELSA is funded jointly by the National Institute on Aging in the US and a consortium of UK government departments: Department of Health and Social Care; Department for Work and Pensions; and Department for Transport coordinated by the National Institute for Health and Care Research (NIHR). Funding has also been provided by the Economic and Social Research Council.

== Study design and data collection ==
The first wave of ELSA achieved a sample comprising 11,050 respondents aged 50 and over on 1 March 2002. Sample members are drawn from respondents to the Health Survey For England (HSE) and the initial data collected for that survey are subsequently linked to the ongoing ELSA measurements. For waves 3, 4, 6, 7 and 9 refreshment samples selected from HSE 2001–04; 2006; 2009–2011; 2011–2012; and HSAE 2013–2015 were added, respectively. The main interview takes the form of a personal interview using CAPI (computer-assisted personal interview) followed by a short self-completion questionnaire. Other components of the study include: a nurse visit involving measurements of physical function, anthropometric measurements and blood/saliva samples; a life-history interview collecting information on lifetime family circumstances, place of residence, employment and major health events prior to the baseline interview; and an end of life interview, initially adapted from US Health and Retirement Study (HRS), carried out by close friends/relatives of an eligible ELSA respondent who has died to collect information about the respondent's circumstances in the period since the final interview and their death.

Over the course of the study to date, the following data have been collected:

- March 2002 - March 2003: Wave 1 Interview
- June 2004 - June 2005: Wave 2 Interview + Nurse visit
- May 2006 - August 2007: Wave 3 Interview
- March 2007 – October 2007: Life-history interview
- May 2008 - June 2009: Wave 4 Interview + Nurse visit
- June 2010 - June 2011: Wave 5 Interview
- May 2012 - June 2013: Wave 6 Interview + Nurse visit
- June 2014 - June 2015: Wave 7 Interview
- May 2016 - June 2017: Wave 8 Interview + Nurse visit (nurse visit carried out on half of the sample)
- July 2018 - July 2019: Wave 9 Interview + Nurse visit (nurse visit carried out on half of the sample)
- June 2020 - July 2020: ELSA COVID-19 Study Wave 1 (online and telephone survey)
- November - December 2020: ELSA COVID-19 Study Wave 2 (online and telephone survey)
- October 2021 - March 2023: Wave 10 Interview
- October 2023 - January 2024: Wave 11 interview + health visit + Life History questionnaire

== Data and findings ==
Users registered with the UK Data Service (UKDS) can access the ELSA datasets via a web-based download service. A list of publications using ELSA data is maintained on the ELSA website. A selection of descriptive findings from each wave of the study are published every two years and can be downloaded from the website.

Studies based on the ELSA showed that people who are not socially isolated can still be lonely. Loneliness was linked to depression, even among people who were not socially isolated. One study also showed that loneliness and not social isolation is a predictor for developing dementia. Both of these studies underlined the distinction between social isolation and loneliness.

== ELSA genetic data ==
Several genetic data products are available in ELSA: Directly genotyped data; quality controlled genetic data; Polygenic Risk Score Data; Genetic imputation; and Genetic data linked to phenotypic data. Researchers who wish to link the ELSA GWAS or existing candidate gene polymorphisms with ELSA phenotypic data are required to submit a full application to the ELSA Genetic Data Access Committee (ELSA-GDAC).

== Related studies ==
ELSA was established as a sister study to the Health and Retirement Study in the US. ELSA is now part of a growing network of longitudinal ageing studies around the world which provide national data on ageing as well as the opportunity for cross-national comparisons:

- Australian Longitudinal Study of Ageing ALSA
- Brazilian Longitudinal Study of Aging ELSI
- Canadian Longitudinal Study on Ageing CLSA ÉLCV
- China Health and Retirement Longitudinal Study CHARLS
- Costa Rican Longevity and Healthy Aging Study CRELES
- Healthy Ageing in Scotland HAGIS
- Longitudinal Aging Study in India LASI
- Indonesia Family Life Survey IFLS
- The Irish Longitudinal Study on Ageing TILDA
- Japanese Study of Aging and Retirement JSTAR
- Korean Longitudinal Study of Aging KLoSA
- Malaysia Ageing and Retirement Survey MARS
- Mexican Health and Aging Study MHAS
- New Zealand Health, Work and Retirement Survey NZHWR
- Northern Ireland Cohort Longitudinal Study of Ageing NICOLA
- Panel Survey on Health, Aging, and Retirement in Thailand HART
- Survey of Health, Ageing and Retirement in Europe SHARE

== Health differences between England and the US ==
ELSA and HRS data were used to directly compare measures of health, income, and education amongst 55- to 64-year-olds in England and the US. The rates of disease (specifically heart disease, diabetes and cancer) across income groups (low, middle and high income) were significantly higher in the US than England. Differences were found not to be due to measurement or study design, risk factors such as current levels of obesity, drinking and smoking, (which were controlled for) did not explain very much of the international differences. Biomarker data confirmed that these differences in disease were real and not a result of differential reporting behaviour across countries.
