= Global Ageing Survey =

The Global Ageing Survey was the world's largest single survey of later life with 44,000 individuals from 24 countries at the time of its summarising.

It was undertaken by the Oxford Institute of Ageing, Principal Investigators George Leeson and Sarah Harper as part of the HSBC funded Future of Retirement Project (FOR)
