= HKUST Institute for Emerging Market Studies =

University-level institute in Hong Kong

HKUST Institute for Emerging Market Studies (HKUST IEMS)
- Established: 2013
- Director: Donald Low
- Location: Lo Ka Chung Building; The Hong Kong University of Science and Technology; Clear Water Bay, Kowloon, Hong Kong
- Website: iems.ust.hk

HKUST Institute for Emerging Market Studies (HKUST IEMS) is a university-level institute under the Office of the Vice-President for Research and Graduate Studies of The Hong Kong University of Science and Technology (HKUST). It is launched on May 27, 2013, with 5 years of financial support from Ernst & Young.
