= Denis Agre =

Bulgarian professional basketball player

Personal information
- Born: March 10, 1988 (age 38) Sofia, Bulgaria
- Listed height: 2.04 m (6 ft 8 in)
- Listed weight: 112 kg (247 lb)

Career information
- High school: SOU "Tzar Ivan Asen II" (Sofia, Bulgaria)
- College: Central Arizona (2007–2008); Pepperdine (2008–2011)
- NBA draft: 2011: undrafted
- Playing career: 2011–2017
- Position: Power forward / center

Career history
- 2011–2012: BC Levski Sofia
- 2012–2013: Spartak Pleven
- 2013–2014: KFUM Nässjö
- 2014–2015: Coulommiers
- 2015-2016: BC Yambol
- 2016-2017: Lukoil Academic

Career highlights
- NBL champion (2017)

Denis Agre (Bulgarian: Денис Агре) (born March 10, 1988) is a Bulgarian professional basketball player, who last played for Lukoil Academic in the Bulgarian League, as a power forward or center. Agre was born in Sofia.

== Career ==
Agre played college basketball for Central Arizona College and Pepperdine. In 2011, he returned to Bulgaria to play for BC Levski Sofia. In 2012, he signed with Spartak Pleven. After two years abroad, in 2015 he signed with BC Yambol.
