= Ruy López Ridaura =

Mexican epidemiologist, scientist and official

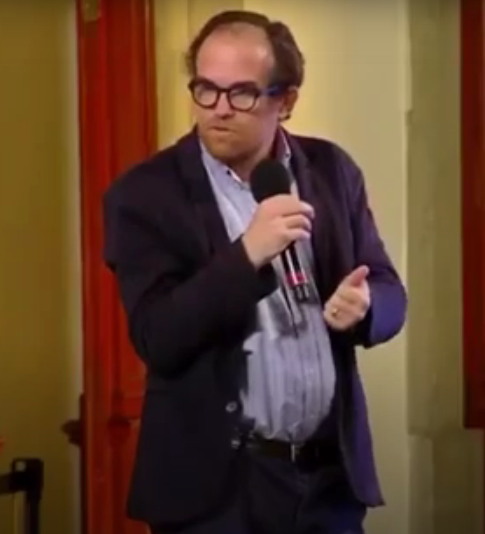
- Occupations: epidemiologist, scientist and official

Ruy López Ridaura is a Mexican epidemiologist, author and infectious diseases expert who has served as head of the National Center for Disease Control and Preventive Programs of the Secretariat of Health of Mexico. Since January 2020, he has been one of the lead members of the task force addressing the COVID-19 pandemic in Mexico.

== Career ==
=== Education ===
López Ridaura attended the School of Medicine of the National Autonomous University of Mexico (UNAM) graduating in 1994 as Physician-Surgeon. At that time he has been friend of Hugo López-Gatell. Afterwards, he obtained a master's degree in Clinic Epidemiology at UNAM in 2000, and later a Ph.D degree in nutritional epidemiology from the Harvard T.H. Chan School of Public Health.

=== Public service ===
From 1998 to 2000 he was a physician at Salvador Zubirán National Institute of Health Sciences and Nutrition (INCMNSZ). From 2005 to 2007 López Ridaura was responsible for the Chronic Diseases Study Division at the National Institute of Public Health (INSP). From 2007 he is head and lead researcher of the Research Unit in Diabetes and Cardiovascular Risk at the same institute. Since 2007 he is director and main researcher of the Study of the Health of Teachers (in Spanish: Cohorte Esmaestras) project, a long-term project dedicated to the study of the development of chronic diseases in female Mexican teachers. From 2013 to 2014 he was a visiting researcher at the research institute of the Hospital Universitario La Paz in Spain. As a teacher López Ridaura is a member of the faculties of INSP and INSSZ.

In 2020 he joined the task force addressing the COVID-19 pandemic in Mexico. He has conducted the daily press conference where the Secretariat of Health directives are giving information about the pandemic.

== Honors and awards ==
- Member of the National System of Researchers, 2014
