= Sarah Harper =

British gerontologist

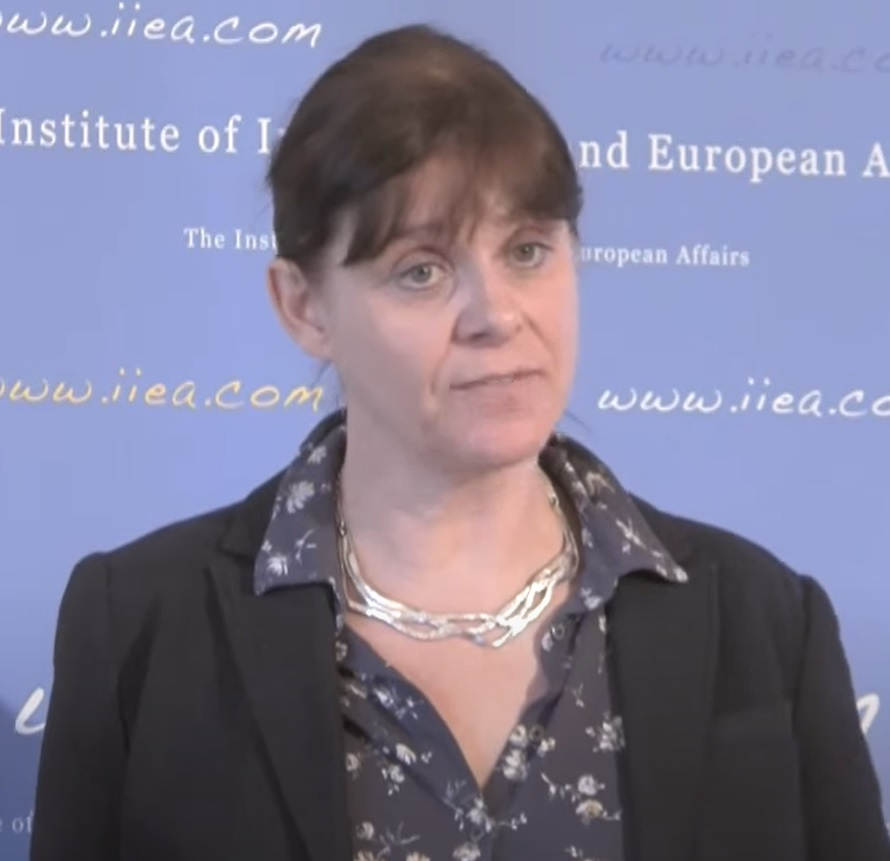
- Occupation: Gerontologist

Academic background
- Education: University of Cambridge; University of Oxford
- Thesis: Rural settlement within the hinterland of conurbations: case studies from Staffordshire and Hampshire (1985)

Sarah Harper FRAI CBE is a British gerontologist, who established Oxford's Institute of Population Ageing, and became the University of Oxford's first Professor of Gerontology. She served on the Prime Minister's Council for Science and Technology between 2014 and 2017 and in 2017 was appointed Director of the Royal Institution of Great Britain. Sarah was appointed a CBE in 2018 for services to the Science of Demography.

== Early career ==
Following her doctoral work in population studies at Oxford, Sarah trained with the BBC as a News and Current Affairs Reporter and Producer, working in both TV and Radio for BBC News and BBC News Night. After leaving the BBC she took up a lectureship at the University of London.

In 1986 Harper was elected to serve on the Executive of the British Society of Gerontology, while still a postdoctoral researcher, the youngest member ever. The following year she became a visiting professor at the University of Utah and shortly after was invited to take up the Irving B Harris Visiting Chair at the University of Chicago.

In 1997 on her return to the University of Oxford, to join the Wellcome Unit for the History of Medicine, she was invited by the UK Nuffield Foundation to establish and run their new Programme on Older People. The following year she secured funding from the US National Institute of Aging, NIA, for the English Longitudinal Study of Ageing, a mirror survey of the US Health and Retirement Study she had experience of while in the US, and to establish the Oxford Centre on Population Ageing. This centre was based on her experience of the Center of Demography and Economics at the University of Chicago. In 2001 the University of Oxford agreed to convert the population centre into a fully fledged Institute -with a focus on global population ageing. The Oxford Institute of Population Ageing, a multi-disciplinary research institute, was the first to focus on population ageing at the global, national and individual levels. The structure of the institute draws on Harper's vision which she outlines in her book Ageing Societies: Myths, Challenges and Opportunities, published in 2006, which addresses the impact of population ageing on work, family, health and society in both the developed and less developed regions.

In 2006 she published an article "Mature Societies" in Daedalus which set the agenda for a new concept of global gerontology. She is research active in Asia, Europe, and Africa. In 2008 she was awarded the University of Malaya Chair in Old Age, as a recognition of her unique contribution to research in Asian ageing studies. Harper's research was recognised by the 2011 Royal Society for Public Health: Arts and Health Research Award. Harper was selected to present the 2012 Oxford London Public Lecture on the new global population "21st Century: Last Century of Youth?" run in association with The Guardian newspaper.

== Professional life ==
Harper served on the Prime Minister's Council for Science and Technology between 2014 and 2017 which advises the prime minister of the day on the scientific evidence for strategic policies and frameworks. She chaired the UK government Foresight Review on Ageing Societies, and the European Ageing Index Panel for the UNECE Population Unit. Harper is a non-executive Director of Health Data UK, a Trustee of the UK Research Integrity Office, and a Governor of the Pensions Policy Institute. She is a Fellow of the Royal Anthropology Institute, and a Fellow of University College, Oxford.

Harper's main focus has been engaging the wider academic and public policy community in her vision of global population ageing. In the area of work and pensions Harper is a governor of the Pensions Policy Institute, a former trustee of Club Vita the new longevity comparison club for occupational pension schemes, and a former trustee of the Third Age Employment Network. She served on the Royal Society working group "People and the Planet" and World Economic Forum Global Agenda Council on Ageing. Harper served on the Academy of Medical Sciences Population Health 2040 enquiry, and the Wellcome Trust Health Consequences of Population Change Panel. Harper has served as the global advisor on ageing to the international bank HSBC, and is the principal investigator with George Leeson on the Global Ageing Survey, which asked 44,000 people in 24 countries about their attitudes and behaviours towards later life and retirement.

Harper was announced as the new director of the Royal Institution in April 2017, taking up the position from 1 May. She resigned and left the Royal Institution in September 2017.

Harper is the founding editor and the editor-in-chief of the Journal of Population Ageing, published by Springer, and her latest book How Population Change will Transform our World, is published by OUP, 2016. Harper's other works include Families in Ageing Societies, OUP 2004 and Ageing in Asia 2008 (with Roger Goodman).

Harper has served as the global advisor on ageing to the international bank HSBC, and is the principal investigator with George Leeson on the Global Ageing Survey, which asked 44,000 people in 24 countries about their attitudes and behaviours towards later life and retirement.

Harper is a frequent speaker at academic, corporate and public events, many internationally. Alongside keynotes at academic conferences, Sarah has spoken at World Economic Forums in China and Australia, presented various TED and TED linked talks, is a regular speaker at Literary and Science Festivals including Hay, Edinburgh, Oxford and Cheltenham.

In 2023, Harper told the Daily Telegraph that a falling UK birth rate would be "good for… our planet”. She said: “I think it’s a good thing that the high-income, high-consuming countries of the world are reducing the number of children that they’re having."

Harper was elected a Fellow of the Academy of Medical Sciences in 2023.
