= Emily Agree =

American sociologist

- Education: University of Rochester (B.A., 1980); Georgetown University (M.A., 1986); Duke University (Ph.D., 1993)
- Scientific career
- Workplaces: Johns Hopkins University; Population Studies Center at the University of Michigan

Emily M. Agree is an American sociologist. She is a professor of sociology in the Departments of Sociology and Population, Family, and Reproductive Health at Johns Hopkins University, and associate director at the Hopkins Population Center.

== Education ==
Agree graduated with B.A. degree in population studies from the University of Rochester in 1980. After writing a thesis entitled "Patterns of Contact between Older Unmarried Women and their Adult Children: A Multivariate Analysis" at Georgetown University, she graduated with an M.A. in demography in 1986. She then wrote her dissertation on "The Effects of Demographic Change on Living Arrangements of the Elderly in Brazil: 1960-1980" at Duke University where she got her Ph.D. in sociology in 1993.

== Career ==
Following her graduation from Duke, Agree was a postdoctoral research fellow at the Population Studies Center at the University of Michigan in Ann Arbor, Michigan. From 1995 to 2003, Agree was an assistant professor at the Department of Population, Family, and Reproductive Health of the Johns Hopkins Bloomberg School of Public Health and then served as its associate professor until 2012. During her time at the Johns Hopkins University, Agree was also an interim director at the Johns Hopkins Population Center from 2005 to 2006 and served as director of its Center for Population Aging and Health from 2009 to 2012. She also served as a visiting research fellow and scholar at the Office for National Statistics in the United Kingdom in 2002 and at Age Concern Institute of Gerontology of King's College London from 2002 to 2004 respectively.

Prior to her graduation, Agree was a consultant researcher at the Research and Policy Division of the World Bank Group in 1983 in Washington, D.C. In 1984, she joined the Government Accountability Office as elevator and the same year was promoted as research associate at the Center for Population Research in Georgetown University. She then served as a senior research associate from 1985 to 1986 at the same university until she was promoted to senior research scholar in 1987 and by 1990 became associate population affairs officer at the Department of International Economic and Social Affairs, Population Division, Population and Development Section of the United Nations.

As a consultant, Agree served for World Bank Group from 1982 to 1983 and from 1988 to 1992 she served with Decision Demographics and the United Nations Population Division. From 1993 to 1994, Agree served with the National Academy on Aging of the United States Administration on Aging and from 1994 to 2000 was with the United Nations Economic Commission for Europe following which she served with the United States Census Bureau in 2000 and 2008 respectively.

== Recognitions ==
Agree is a member of the Gerontological Society of America since 1984 and a fellow of the same society since 1998.
