= Martin Kohli =

Swiss sociologist

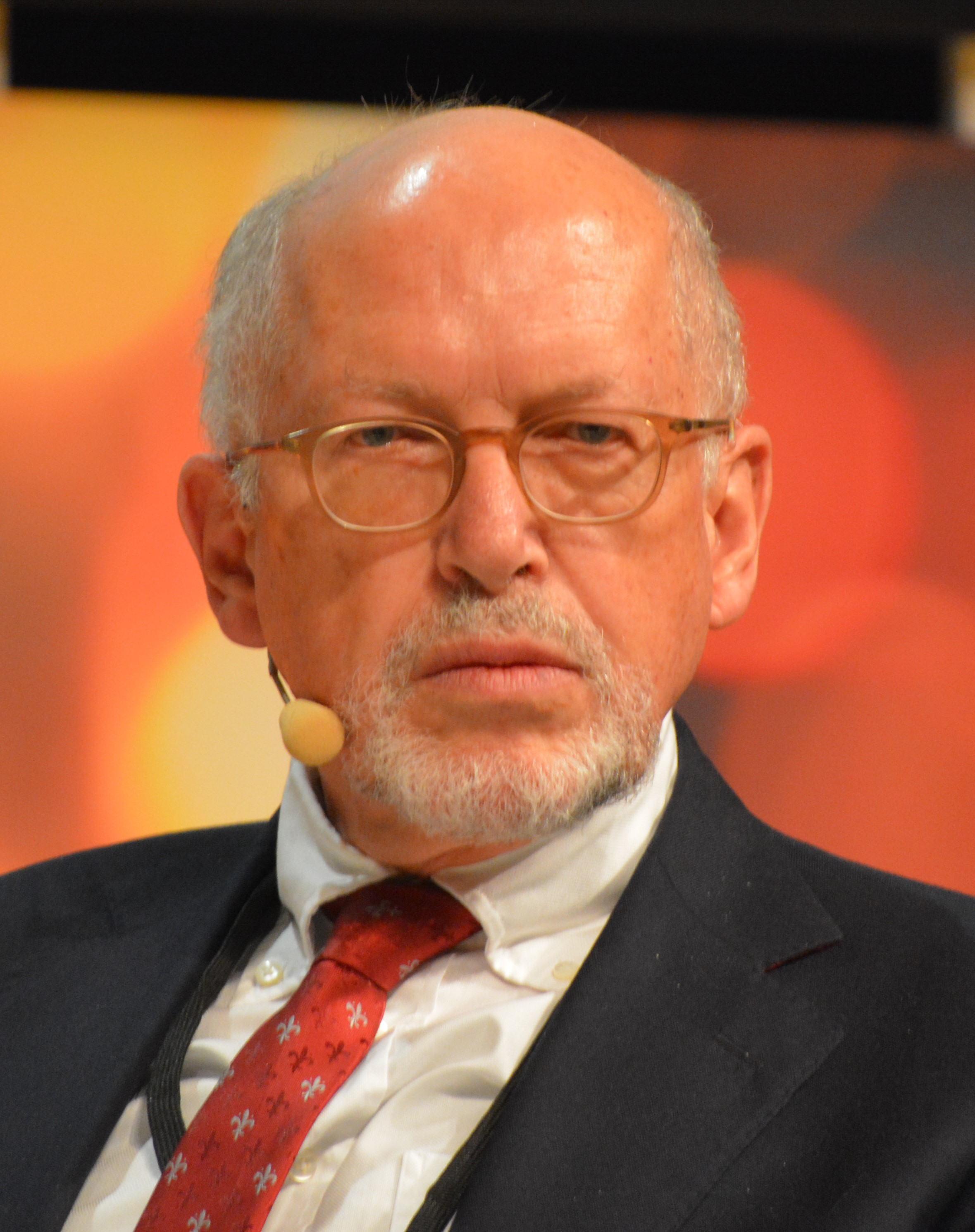
Martin Kohli

Martin Kohli (born 8 May 1942 in Solothurn, Switzerland) is Emeritus Professor of Sociology at the European University Institute (EUI) in Fiesole/Florence and Professor (ret.) at Freie Universität Berlin.

== Life ==
Martin Kohli attended high school at the Kantonsschule Solothurn and spent a year as an AFS International Scholarship recipient at the high school in Upland, California. After graduating from high school in 1962 and serving in the Swiss military, he studied sociology and economics in Geneva, Cologne and Bern until 1968. The following three years, he worked as an educational consultant in the Education Directorate (Ministry of Education) of the Canton of Zurich, before becoming a research assistant at the University of Constance in 1971. In 1972, he received his doctorate (Dr. rer. pol., summa cum laude) from the University of Bern, and in 1977 his habilitation at the University of Constance. In the same year Kohli was appointed full professor in sociology (initially AH5/C3, from 1985 C4) at the Free University of Berlin. In 1985 he founded the Research Group on Aging and the Life Course (FALL), which he directed together with Harald Künemund. In 2004 Kohli was appointed full professor in sociology at the European University Institute in Fiesole/Florence, which he held until 2012. Since then, he has been Distinguished Bremen Professor at the Bremen International Graduate School of Social Sciences (BIGSSS).

Between 1985 and 2012, Kohli undertook several research visits and visiting professorships, including at Harvard University (1989), Stanford University (1989), Columbia University (2000), and University of California, Berkeley (2012). From 1984-85 he was a Member of the Institute of Advanced Study (Princeton), from 1995-96 a Fellow at the Collegium Budapest, and from 2000-01 a Fellow at the Hanse-Wissenschaftskolleg (Delmenhorst).

In addition to his research and teaching activities, Kohli was (co-)editor of the book series "Lebenslauf-Alter-Generation“ (Life course-Age-Generation), European Societies and „Biographie und Gesellschaft“ (Biography and Society). He was also a co-editor of the Zeitschrift für Soziologie (Journal of Sociology), Zeitschrift für Sozialisationsforschung und Erziehungssoziologie (ZSE) (Journal of Socialization Research & Sociology of Education), and BIOS - Zeitschrift für Biographieforschung und Oral History (Journal of Biographical Research and Oral History), and a member of the editorial board of numerous other journals, including Ageing & Society, Advances in Life Course Research, and Lien Social et Politiques. From 1997-99 he was president of the European Sociological Association (ESA).

Martin Kohli has been a regular member of the Berlin-Brandenburg Academy of Sciences and Humanities since 1995, and a corresponding member of the Austrian Academy of Sciences and Humanities since 2001. In 2002, Martin Kohli received the Distinguished Scholar Award of the Aging and Life Course Section of the American Sociological Association. He has been a Fellow of the Gerontological Society of America since 2005 and an Honorary Member of ESA since 2010. In 2014, Martin Kohli received an honorary doctorate from the University of Bern.

== Research focus ==
Martin Kohli's research interests are in life course, generational and aging research and related research fields (family, population, work, welfare state).

=== Life course and Biography ===
Based on his premise of the historical genesis of the life course, Kohli made the influential proposal that the life course should be understood as an institution. Only through decreasing mortality and the notion that death moves into old age does the life course become perceived as such and thus becomes plannable. In this context, Kohli understood the life course as twofold: one in the sense of an institutionally anchored program, a formal course of life as it is shown, for example, in educational, professional, and family careers, and secondly a culturally shaped subjective biographical perspective. With this interpretation of the life course, Kohli made a major contribution to life course research. As the life course structures the life-time horizon, it can become the basis of biographical balancing. The special quality of the biographical approach for sociology lies in the fact that the relationship between individuality and society can be recognized particularly well in the analysis of biographies. In addition, Kohli dealt with different life course regimes and the differentiation of different life courses according to socio-demographic criteria. With his conception of the institutionalized life course, Kohli made it clear that the life course is to be understood as an independent social institution in the form of a system of rules that organizes central areas of life around the modern organization of gainful employment.

=== Generation, Family, Welfare State ===
Following his concept of the life course, Kohli studied intergenerational relationships and intergenerational conflicts. With his research on intergenerational transfers within families, Kohli also obtained important insights into the debate on the social welfare contract between generations. He could show both for Germany and in comparative studies for other countries that the transfers from old to young within families have not come to a halt as a result of the establishment of the welfare state. Kohli’s empirical research further focused on the relationship between public funding and private transfers. Kohli also contributed to theoretically frame the concept of generation. He correlated familial generations (which on the micro level primarily refer to the members of a lineage) with societal generations. The societal generation can be differentiated by its cultural, political and economic dimensions. Yet again, Kohli was concerned with the issues of social inequality and intergenerational tensions and conflicts and how they are mediated by family and politics.

=== Age, Aging Survey, SHARE ===
For his empirical research, Kohli drew on data from the Aging Survey, which was developed by the FALL research group and first conducted in 1996. In the modern institutionalized life course, "retirement" has developed into an independent phase of life, which confronts sociology with novel theoretical and empirical tasks. The Aging Survey created a central empirical basis for research on the "second half of life" in an aging society. It provided a viable basis both for basic research in the sense of a comprehensive analysis of the forms of socialization in old age and for social reporting. In addition, the survey - now based at the German Center of Gerontology in Berlin - had an interdisciplinary approach from the beginning and used both sociological and psychological survey instruments. Together with Harald Künemund, Kohli was also involved in the development of the Survey of Health, Ageing and Retirement in Europe (SHARE), which was conducted for the first time in 2004. Such comparative European research was a central motif in Kohli's later work. With the help of these comparative data sets, it was possible, for example, to analyze family regimes in connection with nationally specific welfare regimes.

== Kohli Foundation for Sociology ==
The Kohli Foundation for Sociology, established by Kohli in 2022, is dedicated to promoting sociology as a scientific discipline and its interdisciplinary connections. The foundation aims to help enhance the profile of sociology as a core social science discipline and make it more visible. The program of the Kohli Foundation for Sociology includes scientific awards and research fellowships.
