= Self-perceptions of aging =

Self-perceptions of aging (SPA) are the perceptions, beliefs and evaluations that individuals hold about their own aging. The term covers both a person's overall attitude toward growing older, such as whether they feel that things keep getting worse with age, and their perceptions of specific age-related gains and losses in areas such as health, cognition and social relationships. Self-perceptions of aging belong to a broader family of constructs known as subjective aging or views on aging, which also includes subjective age (how old a person feels) and the age stereotypes that people hold about older adults as a group. Research on SPA is based on several theories. Stereotype embodiment theory, proposed by the psychologist Becca Levy, holds that age stereotypes absorbed from the surrounding culture from childhood onward become self-relevant in later life and then affect health through psychological, behavioral and physiological pathways. Lifespan developmental psychology emphasizes that aging involves both gains and losses, and that perceptions of one's own aging are multidimensional and change across adulthood.

SPA are most often measured with the five-item Attitude Toward Own Aging subscale of the Philadelphia Geriatric Center Morale Scale, Aging Perceptions Questionnaire, and the Awareness of Age-Related Change questionnaire. Longitudinal studies have linked more positive SPA with better functional health, mental health and cognitive functioning and with longer survival; a 2023 meta-analysis of 107 studies found that these associations did not differ by participants' age, type of outcome or length of follow-up, and that they were small in size. How far the associations reflect causal effects remains debated, because declining health can also make people's views of their own aging more negative. Meta-analyses have found that education and intergenerational contact reduce ageism by improving attitudes toward older people. Those interventions target SPA directly and produce a statistically significant improvement in SPA.

== Conceptualization ==
=== Definition and scope ===
InBecca Levy's early work, she defined self-perceptions of aging (SPA) as how older adults perceive their own aging. She distinguished SPA from age stereotypes, which refer to beliefs about older people as a group. Later researchers developed a broader definition of SPA. Perceptions of one's own aging are based on age-related experiences, expectations in different life domains, and on age-related feedback from the social environment. In this broader sense, SPA include how people evaluate their aging overall, what they expect to happen to them as they grow older, and which specific changes they notice in themselves and attribute to age.

SPA are studied mainly in middle-aged and older adults. Much of the research comes from large longitudinal studies. These include the Health and Retirement Study (HRS) in the United States, the German Ageing Survey (DEAS), the Berlin Aging Study, the Australian Longitudinal Study of Aging, and the Irish Longitudinal Study on Ageing (TILDA). Some reviews restrict the term to people aged 50 or older. Other researchers have emphasized the importance of studying SPA in midlife, because that attitudes toward aging during midlife may influence how people adjust psychologically to older age.

Within research on ageism, negative SPA are often described as a form of self-directed or internalized ageism, in which negative societal views of old age are applied to oneself. A large systematic review of ageism and health also included negative SPA as a measure of individual-level ageism. At the same time, other measures included negative age stereotypes and experience of age discrimination.

=== Positive and negative self-perceptions of aging ===
Early studies usually treated SPA as a single dimension running from negative to positive. For example, the widely used Attitude Toward Own Aging scale produces one overall score. Agreement with statements such as "Things keep getting worse as I get older" indicates a more negative view of aging. Later research suggested that positive and negative SPA are partly separate dimensions. Steverink and colleagues studied 4,034 Germans aged 40 to 85. They identified three dimensions of aging experiences: physical decline, social loss, and continuous growth. In this tradition, positive SPA refer to experiencing aging as a period of ongoing development and personal growth, whereas negative SPA refer to experiences or expectations of physical and social losses. The awareness of age-related change (AARC) framework also separates age-related gains from losses. This framework assumes and suggests that people can experience both at the same time.

Several findings suggest that the two dimensions are not simply opposite ends of one scale. First, one German study followed participants for 23 years. The researchers found that gain-related SPA predicted mortality, while loss-related SPA showed no unique association with mortality. Second, a meta-analysis of AARC studies found that greater awareness of age-related gains was associated with better emotional well-being (r = .33). However, its association with physical well-being was negligible. While, greater awareness of age-related losses was associated with poorer physical well-being (r = −.38). Perceived gains and losses can also follow different paths over time: in one longitudinal study of middle-aged and older Germans, perceived gains declined on average in most domains. However, perceived general losses remained relatively stable.

=== Related concepts and distinctions ===
SPA are part of a wider field that researchers variously call subjective aging, awareness of aging or views on aging. Views on aging include people's beliefs about older adults and aging in general. This also include beliefs about one's own age and aging. The self-related part, called subjective aging, includes both SPA and subjective age. Diehl and colleagues proposed classifying subjective aging constructs along three distinctions: whether they are person-centered or socio-centered, unidimensional or multidimensional, and conscious or preconscious.

Subjective age, or felt age, refers to how old a person feels as opposed to their chronological age. It is usually measured with a single question. Most adults report feeling younger than they are; one study found that people over 40 felt on average about 20% younger than their actual age. Subjective age and SPA are related but are not the same concept. A 2023 meta-analysis found that SPA measures with multiple items predicted later health more strongly than single-item measures of subjective age.

Age stereotypes are beliefs about older people as a group. According to stereotype embodiment theory, they turn into self-stereotypes, and thus into SPA. This process may occur when people begin to see themselves as old. Researchers therefore distinguish general views on aging, which concern older people in general, from personal views on one's own aging. Longitudinal studies suggest that these two types of views may influence each other over time.

Awareness of age-related change was introduced by Diehl and Wahl in 2010. It describes how people become aware of changes in their behavior, abilities, or experiences as they grow older. Related constructs include expectations regarding aging, which concern what people anticipate for their own future health and functioning, and age identity, including the tendency of some older adults to distance themselves psychologically from their own age group.

== Theoretical background ==
=== Stereotype embodiment theory ===
Stereotype embodiment theory (SET), formulated by Levy, is one of the main frameworks used to explain how SPA develop and why they might affect health. The theory has four main ideas. First, people begin to learn age stereotypes in childhood and continue to absorb them throughout life. Second, these stereotypes can operate unconsciously. Third, they become more important when people begin to apply them to themselves. Fourth, they can affect health through psychological, behavioral, and physiological pathways. Because children and young adults encounter stereotypes about older people long before they belong to that group themselves, they have little reason to resist them. Thus, it can become stronger over time. As people grow older, they may begin to apply these beliefs to themselves. Levy describes these internalized beliefs as self-stereotypes, or self-perceptions of aging.

Evidence cited in support of SET comes from experimental and longitudinal studies. In laboratory experiments, older participants who were subliminally exposed to negative age-stereotype words performed worse on memory tasks and showed greater cardiovascular reactivity to stress than participants exposed to positive words. The Baltimore Longitudinal Study of Aging also provided evidence for SET. In this study, adults aged 18 to 49 who held more negative age stereotypes were more likely to experience a cardiovascular event over the following 38 years. This association remained after researchers adjusted for relevant risk factors. Meanwhile, other longitudinal studies found that SPA predicted functional health, preventive health behaviors and survival over periods of up to 23 years.

SET differs from stereotype threat theory, which concerns the situational fear of confirming a negative stereotype in a particular testing context. In contrast, SET focuses on how stereotypes are internalized over time and how they may affect health in everyday life. However, it is worth to mention that the two frameworks are related: a meta-analysis of age-based stereotype threat found that older adults' performance was impaired when negative age stereotypes were made salient; and the effect was stronger when threat was induced through negative stereotypes than through factual statements about age-related decline.

=== Lifespan developmental perspective ===
Lifespan developmental psychology is closely associated with psychologist Paul Baltes. This perspective suggests that human development continues throughout life. It also emphasizes that development involves multiple dimensions and both gains and losses. Applied to SPA, this perspective implies that people may experience their own aging as involving gains in some domains and losses in others. Adults of different ages in a 1989 study expected the balance of desirable and undesirable changes to become less favorable with advancing age, but they also expected some gains to continue into old age. Later, Diehl, Wahl, and colleagues developed the concepts of awareness of aging and awareness of age-related change. These concepts recognize that people can experience different types of changes across areas of life.

Other research suggests that views on aging differ across life domains. Kornadt and Rothermund developed a measure of age stereotypes in areas such as family, work, and health. They found that stereotypes in different domains were largely independent; the positivity of a person's age stereotypes in a given domain predicted their life satisfaction in that same domain. A four-year study followed 593 adults aged 30 to 80. The researchers found that younger and middle-aged adults were more likely to internalize age stereotypes into their own views of aging. This process was strongest when age-related changes were expected in the near future, while older participants were more likely to project their own views of aging onto age stereotypes. Thus, Kornadt and colleagues have accordingly argued that views on aging should be studied across the entire lifespan, because they begin to form early in life, change with experience and shape development well before old age.

=== Self-regulation and psychological processes ===
Another theoretical perspective focuses on how SPA relate to self-regulation during aging. Wurm and colleagues summarized three groups of mechanisms through which views on aging may affect health: psychological mechanisms such as control beliefs, self-efficacy and the will to live; behavioral mechanisms (physical activity and other health behaviors); and physiological mechanisms (responses to stress). The Aging Perceptions Questionnaire was developed based on Howard Leventhal's self-regulation model of illness. This approach examines how people understand and respond to their own aging. in other words, it focuses on how people perceive the timeline, consequences, controllability, and emotional effects of aging.

Several studies have examined these mechanisms. In Levy's 23-year study, the will to live partly explained the relationship between positive SPA and longer survival. Using German data, Wurm and colleagues found that older adults with more positive SPA made greater use of selection, optimization and compensation strategies, which were in turn associated with better health. Negative attitudes toward one's own aging have also been linked to greater reactivity to daily stressors, but dispositional optimism appears to buffer the association between negative SPA and poorer physical and mental health.

Self-regulation also works in the opposite direction, as people try to protect a positive self-image in the face of aging. Rothermund and Brandtstädter tested three competing assumptions: 1. suggested that age stereotypes influence how older people see themselves. 2. suggested that people use age stereotypes to make favorable comparisons with themselves. 3. suggested that people project their own self-views onto their beliefs about older adults. Their longitudinal data supported both contamination (the first) and projection (the third), but not the comparison hypothesis (the second). The researchers also found that people's ability to adjust their goals flexibly influenced these processes. Kornadt and Rothermund proposed that stereotypes are internalized via future self-views, a form of possible selves, and found this pathway to be stronger among older participants. They interpreted as showing that internalization depends on categorizing oneself as old. Older adults may also protect themselves by dissociating from their age group: Experimental studies found that older participants were more likely to psychologically distance themselves from other older adults when negative age stereotypes were made more noticeable.

== Measurement ==
=== Unidimensional measures ===
One of the most widely used measures of SPA is the Attitude Toward Own Aging (ATOA) subscale of the Philadelphia Geriatric Center Morale Scale, developed by the gerontologist M. Powell Lawton. In 1975, Lawton revised the original 22-item scale and identified three factors among 17 items. These were agitation, attitude toward own aging, and lonely dissatisfaction. The ATOA subscale consists of five items about respondents' current experience of their own aging, answered in a dichotomous format, and its factor structure was later re-examined by Liang and Bollen. All 21 studies included in a 2021 systematic review of longitudinal SPA research used the ATOA, which proved reliable in each of them. Adapted versions of the ATOA are also used in large population surveys, including the Health and Retirement Study (HRS).

Subjective age is typically assessed with a single question asking how old respondents feel. Kastenbaum and colleagues developed a broader approach called the "ages of me." This approach asks people how old they feel, look, and act. It also asks about the age associated with their interests. Researchers often express subjective age as the discrepancy between felt and chronological age, sometimes as a proportion of chronological age. Otherwise, some longitudinal studies, including the Berlin Aging Study, have used short measures of satisfaction with one's own aging.

Expectations about one's own aging are measured with the Expectations Regarding Aging survey. The original 38-item version was developed with 429 older adults in Los Angeles. The shortened ERA-12 contains three four-item scales covering expectations about physical health, mental health and cognitive function. The 12 items can also be combined into an overall score.

These questionnaires all rely on conscious self-report. To capture age-related attitudes that may operate outside awareness, as suggested by stereotype embodiment theory. Researchers have therefore used other methods, including age-related versions of the Implicit Association Test and subliminal priming experiments.

=== Multidimensional measures ===
Several questionnaires measure SPA across different dimensions. The Aging-Related Cognitions (AgeCog) scales were developed for the German Ageing Survey. They measure three views of aging: physical losses, social losses, and continuous growth.

The Aging Perceptions Questionnaire (APQ) was developed based on the self-regulation model of aging. It was validated in 2007 using a random sample of 2,033 Irish adults aged 65 and older who lived in the community. Its items address seven dimensions of views about one's own aging—chronic and cyclical timeline, positive and negative consequences, positive and negative control, and emotional representations—while an eighth "identity" domain records health-related changes that respondents have experienced. Researchers later developed a shorter 17-item version called the Brief Ageing Perceptions Questionnaire. It was developed using confirmatory factor analysis, and the APQ has also been used in the Irish Longitudinal Study on Ageing.

For cross-cultural use, the World Health Organization's WHOQOL-OLD group developed the Attitudes to Ageing Questionnaire (AAQ). After pilot testing with 1,356 participants in 15 centers and a field test with 5,566 participants from 20 centers worldwide. The final questionnaire contains 24 items and measures three dimensions: psychological growth, psychosocial loss, and physical change.

The Awareness of Age-Related Change (AARC) questionnaire measures both perceived gains and losses associated with aging. It covers five areas: health and physical functioning, cognitive functioning, interpersonal relationships, social-cognitive and social-emotional functioning, and lifestyle and engagement. Its developers designed it to reflect the multidirectionality of aging, so that gains and losses can be reported simultaneously within the same domain. The original version contains 50 items. A shorter 10-item version was later developed for use in large population surveys. Kornadt and Rothermund also developed questionnaires that measure views on aging across different areas of life. These questionnaires ask people about their beliefs regarding older adults in general and their expectations about their own aging. This approach allows researchers to compare general age stereotypes with personal views of aging.

== Development across the lifespan ==
=== Formation of SPA ===
According to stereotype embodiment theory, the roots of SPA lie in childhood, when people first absorb their culture's images of old age. Research suggests that these beliefs form at an early age. Among 126 Belgian children aged three to six, views of older people were already ambivalent, though often favorable with regard to traits such as warmth. The children's views did not correlate with those of their parents and appeared to be shaped by their relationships with their grandparents.

Cultural views of aging have also changed over time. One study analyzed the Corpus of Historical American English, which contains about 400 million words from printed texts published between 1810 and 2009. The researchers found that age stereotypes in American English became increasingly negative over these two centuries. They suggested that this trend was partly related to the growing medicalization of aging and the increasing proportion of older adults in the population. Because younger people do not yet belong to the stereotyped group, SET assumes that they absorb such images largely without resistance, and that these images later shape how they perceive their own aging.

Longitudinal studies have traced this process of internalization directly. Among middle-aged and older Germans, domain-specific age stereotypes predicted later self-views through people's expectations about their own future selves, and the effect was stronger for older participants. Another four-year study found that people were more likely to internalize stereotypes in areas where age-related changes were approaching. In later life, the reverse process became more important. Older adults were more likely to apply their personal aging experiences to their general beliefs about older people.

SPA are also shaped by direct experience. Serious health events can change how people view their own aging. In the German Ageing Survey, individuals who experienced a cardiovascular event such as a heart attack or stroke showed more adverse changes in their views on aging over three years than a matched comparison group.

Experiences of age discrimination may also contribute to more negative SPA

=== Changes across adulthood ===
On average, SPA tend to become less favorable with advancing age, but the pattern differs between dimensions and periods of life. There is a study used German Ageing Survey data from 4,712 adults. The researchers examined three dimensions of aging perceptions: physical losses, social losses, and ongoing development. All three dimensions showed significant nonlinear changes with age. These changes were related to both personal and environmental factors, including health. Positive emotions were most strongly associated with perceptions of ongoing development. In the Berlin Aging Study, which followed adults aged 70 to 100 for up to 16 years, satisfaction with one's own aging declined more sharply as participants approached death than as they grew older, whereas changes in subjective age were more closely related to chronological age. Other studies have found that perceived age-related gains tend to decline in most areas of life from midlife onward, while perceived general losses remain relatively stable.

Subjective age, by contrast, moves away from chronological age: adults increasingly feel younger than they are as they get older, so that people over 40 typically report feeling about one-fifth younger than their actual age. This “subjective rejuvenation” also appears to have increased across generations. In the German Ageing Survey, later-born cohorts of middle-aged and older adults reported feeling younger than earlier-born cohorts at the same ages, and their subjective age remained more stable over time. People's views about when old age begins also change with age. In the German Ageing Survey, adults aged 64 reported that old age began at around 75 on average. This perceived starting age increased by about one year for every four to five years that participants grew older. Later-born generations also tended to place the beginning of old age at a later age. Historical events can modify these trajectories; analyses of German data spanning 2008 to 2020 found partial evidence that the COVID-19 pandemic affected attitudes toward own aging and subjective age.

Researchers have also studied how attitudes toward aging change during midlife. A 12-year study of two German cohorts, born in 1930–1932 and in 1950–1952, examined how attitudes toward own aging developed in early old age and in midlife. It investigated whether personality, health, and sociodemographic characteristics predicted these changes.

=== Individual differences ===
In the German Ageing Survey, younger age, better self-rated health, higher income, more education, greater hope, and lower loneliness were all associated with fewer perceived physical and social losses and a stronger sense of continued growth. Socioeconomic resources may also influence how ageism affects health. A large systematic review found that older adults with less education were more vulnerable to the negative health effects of ageism.

In the Lothian Birth Cohort 1936, which included 792 Scottish adults assessed at around age 75, personality traits were the strongest predictors of attitudes toward aging. Higher neuroticism, lower extraversion, openness, agreeableness, and conscientiousness, as well as anxiety, depression, and physical disability, were associated with more negative attitudes toward psychosocial loss. A 20-year German study examined the relationship between the Big Five personality traits and attitudes toward one's own aging. The researchers found that personality and aging attitudes were related over time. This suggests that they may develop together during the second half of life.

Findings on gender differences are inconsistent; in some studies, associations differ between women and men depending on the dimension of SPA or the life circumstance considered. Researchers have also begun to examine how aging perceptions differ by sexual orientation and gender identity.

== Associations with health and well-being ==
A 2014 meta-analysis of 19 longitudinal studies found that subjective aging was significantly associated with health, health behaviors, and longevity, with stronger associations in studies with shorter follow-up periods and those examining health rather than survival. A 2023 updated meta-analysis included 107 studies reported in 99 articles. It has a median sample size of 1,863 adults. The result found a similarly small but consistent association between subjective aging and health and longevity over time (likelihood ratio = 1.35). Another 2021 systematic review of 21 longitudinal studies using the ATOA likewise found that more positive SPA were consistently associated with healthier outcomes, including better self-rated health, less obesity, better performance of activities of daily living, less depression, better cognitive functioning and greater longevity.

=== Physical health and functioning ===
There are several large cohort studies have linked SPA to physical functioning in later life. In the Ohio Longitudinal Study of Aging and Retirement, more positive SPA predicted better functional health over time. This relationship remained after adjusting for baseline functional health. Another study followed 598 adults aged 70 and older in Connecticut. The researchers found that those with positive age stereotypes were 44% more likely to recover fully from severe disability than those with negative stereotypes. Among 4,803 adults aged 50 and older in the Irish Longitudinal Study on Ageing, negative perceptions of aging predicted slower walking speed two years later, and changes in SPA were related to changes in physical functioning in the Australian Longitudinal Study of Aging.

More positive SPA have been associated with more preventive health behaviors, more physical exercise and greater use of preventive health services. Those all suggests that health behaviors may carry part of the link between SPA and health. One German study examined 309 adults aged 65 to 85 with multiple chronic conditions. The result showed that physical activity partly explained the association between SPA and self-rated health two and a half years later. Another study, among 105 Canadians aged 80 and older, those who attributed the onset of their chronic illness to "old age" reported more health symptoms and poorer health-maintenance behaviors, and were more likely to die within two years, than those who did not.

In laboratory experiments, older adults exposed to negative age stereotypes showed heightened cardiovascular responses to stress, whereas positive stereotypes reduced these responses. A study of 4,149 HRS participants aged 50 and older found that lower levels of C-reactive protein, a marker of inflammation, partly explained the relationship between positive SPA and longer survival. Negative age stereotypes held in early and middle adulthood have also been linked to a higher risk of cardiovascular events decades later.

=== Psychological well-being ===
SPA are associated with mental health and well-being. In the Irish Longitudinal Study on Ageing, negative perceptions of aging among 6,095 adults aged 50 and older predicted the onset of depression and anxiety two years later, as well as the persistence of these conditions among those already affected. Among HRS participants, SPA mediated the association between perceived age discrimination and increases in depressive symptoms. A meta-analysis using the awareness of age-related change (AARC) framework found that perceived age-related gains were moderately associated with better emotional well-being. In contrast, perceived losses were associated with poorer emotional and physical well-being. In original AgeCog study, perceptions of physical decline, social loss, and continuous growth were related to both positive and negative emotions.

Research on age stereotypes has found similar patterns. One nationally representative study examined 2,031 American military veterans aged 55 and older. Those who fully resisted negative age stereotypes had a much lower prevalence of suicidal ideation, anxiety, and posttraumatic stress disorder than those who fully accepted them. Other studies have examined factors that may moderate these associations. Negative attitudes toward one's own aging have been associated with greater reactivity to daily stressors. Dispositional optimism may reduce the association between negative SPA and poorer mental and physical health.

=== Cognitive functioning ===
Experimental and longitudinal studies have linked SPA and age stereotypes to cognitive functioning. Older adults who were subliminally exposed to negative age stereotypes in a 1996 experiment performed worse on memory tasks than those exposed to positive stereotypes. Related research found that negative age stereotypes can impair older adults' memory performance through stereotype threat.

Participants in the Baltimore Longitudinal Study of Aging who held more negative age stereotypes showed worse memory performance over up to 38 years. In the same study, negative age stereotypes earlier in life predicted greater loss of hippocampal volume. They were linked to greater accumulation of amyloid plaques and neurofibrillary tangles, which are biomarkers of Alzheimer's disease. In Irish Longitudinal Study on Ageing, negative perceptions of aging predicted cognitive decline over time, and attitudes toward one's own aging predicted change in fluid but not crystallized abilities in a 12-year German study.

Research using HRS data has examined the relationship between age beliefs and dementia. One study followed 4,765 adults aged 60 and older who did not have dementia at baseline. Participants with positive age beliefs were less likely to develop dementia. Among those carrying the APOE ε4 allele, a major genetic risk factor for Alzheimer's disease, people with positive age beliefs were 49.8% less likely to develop dementia than those with negative beliefs. Another study examined 1,716 adults aged 65 and older. Participants with mild cognitive impairment were more likely to recover normal cognition if they held positive age beliefs. They recovered up to two years sooner than those with negative beliefs.

However, the direction of these associations remains debated. A three-year study found a bidirectional relationship between SPA and processing speed, while a study of more than 5,000 British adults found that awareness of age-related losses was a stronger predictor of later functioning than the reverse relationship, but was largely unrelated to subsequent cognitive test performance.

=== Longevity and mortality ===
The association between SPA and survival was first reported in a 2002 study of 660 participants aged 50 and older in the Ohio Longitudinal Study of Aging and Retirement. Those with more positive SPA, measured up to 23 years earlier, lived on average 7.5 years longer than those with less positive SPA, after adjustment for age, gender, socioeconomic status, loneliness and functional health. The researchers reported that this survival difference was larger than those previously associated with low blood pressure, low cholesterol, lower body mass index, not smoking, and regular exercise.

Later studies in other countries found similar associations. In the Berlin Aging Study, greater satisfaction with one's own aging was associated with lower mortality among adults aged 70 to 100. Smaller declines in satisfaction over time were linked to lower mortality. In the Australian Longitudinal Study of Aging, longitudinal change in SPA was related to mortality among 1,507 participants aged 65 to 103. In Chinese Longitudinal Healthy Longevity Survey, there are 9783 old participants hold negative SPA were associated with reduced survival, an association partly explained by a less healthy lifestyle among those with negative SPA. A 23-year German study followed 2,400 adults aged 40 and older. The study found that gain-related SPA predicted mortality, while loss-related SPA showed no unique association with mortality.

Meta-analyses have confirmed a significant but small association between subjective aging and longevity. The 2014 meta-analysis found larger effects for health outcomes than for survival, while the 2023 update found no differences by type of health-related outcome. Possible explanations for these relationships include health behaviors, the will to live, and lower levels of stress-related inflammation.

== Intervention ==
Because SPA are associated with health and are thought to be modifiable, researchers have developed interventions intended to improve them, either directly or by reducing the ageism from which negative SPA are thought to arise. The World Health Organization identifies three strategies with evidence of effectiveness against ageism: policy and law, educational activities, and intergenerational contact interventions.

=== Educational approaches ===
Educational interventions aim to replace inaccurate beliefs about aging with accurate information. According to the WHO, such activities can enhance empathy, dispel misconceptions about different age groups and reduce prejudice by providing accurate information and counter-stereotypical examples. A 2019 meta-analysis examined 63 studies conducted between 1976 and 2018, involving 6,124 participants. They compared three types of interventions: education, intergenerational contact, and a combination of both. All three improved attitudes toward older people, and the combined interventions produced the largest effects; effects were strongest among women, adolescents and young adults. The authors noted that these strategies are relatively low-cost and feasible to implement. There are two experiments tested the Positive Education about Aging and Contact Experiences (PEACE) model. The studies included 354 undergraduate students and 505 community participants aged 18 to 59. Brief online education about aging and examples of positive intergenerational contact reduced negative attitudes toward older adults. Participants gained more knowledge about aging.

Most educational interventions focus on younger people's attitudes toward older adults rather than SPA among older adults themselves. The authors of the 2019 meta-analysis recommended these approaches as part of an international effort to improve views of older people and aging. Some educational programs focus directly on older adults. A pilot study at three senior centers in Los Angeles included 46 sedentary adults aged 65 and older. Participants attended four weekly sessions of "attribution retraining." They learned that becoming less physically active is not an inevitable part of aging and that inactivity can have causes that people can change. The program included a weekly exercise class and was associated with increased walking and improved quality of life.

=== Psychological and behavioral approaches ===
Some interventions use psychological techniques to improve SPA directly. In a randomized study, Levy and colleagues examined 100 older adults aged 61 to 99. The researchers compared four conditions: implicit exposure to positive age stereotypes, explicit exercises involving healthy older people, a combination of both, and a control group. The implicit intervention strengthened positive age stereotypes, which in turn strengthened positive SPA and improved physical function, with effects that persisted for three weeks after the last session; the explicit intervention did not have these effects. The authors reported greater improvements in physical function than those observed in an earlier six-month exercise intervention involving participants of similar age.

Other interventions combine SPA education with physical activity programs. In a German randomized controlled trial, adults aged 65 and older were assigned to one of three groups: a physical activity intervention that challenged negative views on aging (n = 101), the same intervention without this component (n = 30), or an active control group that participated in a volunteering program (n = 103). The views-on-aging component improved participants' views on aging, and this change in turn increased their physical activity. Beyer and colleagues found that combining an exercise program with a SPA intervention improved both gain-related and loss-related SPA. SPA remained unchanged among participants who received exercise alone, but physical performance improved in both groups. Another intervention, AgingPLUS, was developed in the United States to promote physical activity among middle-aged and older adults. The program addresses negative views of aging and includes training in self-efficacy and goal planning. A randomized controlled trial found improvements in its targeted mechanisms, including views of aging, self-efficacy beliefs, and behavioral intentions.

=== Evidence from intervention studies ===
A 2024 systematic review and meta-analysis of randomized controlled trials identified 16 eligible studies of interventions targeting SPA among older adults, 12 of which could be pooled. It found a statistically significant overall effect on SPA (standardized effect size −0.56; 95% confidence interval −1.06 to −0.07), and also examined effects on physical performance and mental health.

Not all interventions have shown positive results. One German randomized controlled trial compared a physical activity program with a views-on-aging component against a version with an additional planning task. The study found no significant effects on its main outcomes. Many of these trials were small pilot studies or had follow-up periods of only a few weeks after the intervention. Most measured changes in SPA or physical function rather than long-term health outcomes. The authors of a 2019 meta-analysis on ageism also called for further research using more stronger study designs.
