= Mid-20th-century baby boom =

Baby boom that occurred after World War II

United States birth rate (births per 1000 population). The US Census Bureau defines baby boomers as those born between mid-1946 and mid-1964 (shown in red).

The middle of the 20th century was marked by a significant and persistent increase in fertility rates in many countries, especially in the Western world. The term baby boom is often used to refer to this particular boom, generally considered to have started immediately after World War II, although some demographers place it earlier than or during the war. This terminology led to those born during this baby boom being called the baby boomers.

The boom coincided with a marriage boom. The increase in fertility was driven primarily by a decrease in childlessness and an increase in parity progression to a second child. In most of the Western countries, progression to a third child and beyond declined, which, coupled with aforementioned increase in transition to first and second child, resulted in higher homogeneity in family sizes. The baby boom was most prominent among educated and economically active women.

The baby boom was followed by a significant decline in fertility rates in the mid-late 1960s and 1970s, later called the baby bust (or Generation X) by demographers.

== Causes ==
Economist and demographer Richard Easterlin in his "Twentieth Century American Population Growth" (2000), explains the growth pattern of the American population in the 20th century by examining the fertility rate fluctuations and the decreasing mortality rate. Easterlin attempts to prove the cause of the baby boom and baby bust by the "relative income" theory, despite the various other theories that these events have been attributed to. The "relative income" theory suggests that couples choose to have children based on a couple's ratio of potential earning power and the desire to obtain material objects. This ratio depends on the economic stability of the country and how people are raised to value material objects. The "relative income" theory explains the baby boom by suggesting that the late 1940s and the 1950s brought low desires to have material objects, because of the Great Depression and World War II, as well as plentiful job opportunities (being a post-war period). These two factors gave rise to a high relative income, which encouraged high fertility. Following this period, the next generation had a greater desire for material objects, however, an economic slowdown in the United States made jobs harder to acquire. This resulted in lower fertility rates causing the Baby Bust.

Jan Van Bavel and David S. Reher proposed that the increase in nuptiality (marriage boom) coupled with low efficiency of contraception was the main cause of the baby boom. They doubted the explanations (including the Easterlin hypothesis) which considered the post-war economic prosperity that followed deprivation of the Great Depression as main cause of the baby boom, stressing that GDP-birth rate association was not consistent (positive before 1945 and negative after) with GDP growth accounting for a mere 5 percent of the variance in the crude birth rate over the period studied by the authors. Data shows that only in a few countries was there a significant and persistent increase in the marital fertility index during the baby boom, which suggests that most of the increase in fertility was driven by the increase in marriage rates.

Jona Schellekens argues that the rise in male earnings that started in the late 1930s accounts for most of the rise in marriage rates and that Richard Easterlin's hypothesis according to which a relatively small birth cohort entering the labor market caused the marriage boom is not consistent with data from the United States.

Matthias Doepke, Moshe Hazan, and Yishay Maoz all argued that the baby boom was mainly caused by the alleged crowding out from the labor force of females who reached adulthood during the 1950s by females who started to work during the Second World War and did not quit their jobs after the economy recovered. Andriana Bellou and Emanuela Cardia promote a similar argument, but they claim women who entered the labor force during the Great Depression crowded out women who participated in the baby boom. Glenn Sandström disagrees with both variants of this interpretation based on the data from Sweden showing that an increase in nuptiality (which was one of the main causes of an increase in fertility) was limited to economically active women. He pointed out that in 1939 a law prohibiting the firing of a woman when she got married was passed in the country.

Greenwood, Seshadri, and Vandenbroucke ascribe the baby boom to the diffusion of new household appliances that led to reduction of costs of childbearing. However Martha J. Bailey and William J. Collins criticize their explanation on the basis that improvement of household technology began before the baby boom, differences and changes in ownership of appliances and electrification in U.S. counties are negatively correlated with birth rates during the baby boom, that the correlation between cohort fertility of the relevant women and access to electrical service in early adulthood is negative, and that Amish also experienced the baby boom.

Judith Blake and Prithwis Das Gupta point out the increase in ideal family size in the times of baby boom.

Peter Lindert partially attributed the baby boom to the extension of income tax to most of the US population in the early 1940s and newly created tax exemptions for children and married couples creating a new incentive for earlier marriage and higher fertility. It is proposed that because the taxation was progressive the baby boom was more pronounced among the richer population.

== By region ==
=== Asia and Africa ===
Many countries outside the west (among them Morocco, China and Turkey) also witnessed the baby boom. The baby boom in Mongolia is probably explained by improvement in health and living standards related to the adoption of technologies and modernisation.

=== Europe ===
France and Austria experienced the strongest baby booms in Europe. In contrast to most other countries, the French and Austrian baby booms were driven primarily by an increase in marital fertility. In the French case, pro-natalist policies were an important factor in this increase. Weaker baby booms occurred in Germany, Switzerland, Belgium and the Netherlands.

In the United Kingdom the baby boom occurred in two waves. After a short first wave of the baby boom during the war and immediately after, peaking in 1946, the United Kingdom experienced a second wave during the 1960s, with a peak in births in 1964 and a rapid fall after the Abortion Act 1967 came into force.

The baby boom in Ireland began during the Emergency declared in the country during the Second World War. Laws on contraception were restrictive in Ireland, and the baby boom was more prolonged in this country. Secular decline of fertility began only in the 1970s and particularly after the legalization of contraception in 1979. The marriage boom was even more prolonged and did not recede until the 1980s.

The baby boom was very strong in Norway and Iceland, significant in Finland, moderate in Sweden and relatively weak in Denmark.

Baby boom was absent or not very strong in Italy, Greece, Portugal and Spain. There were however regional variations in Spain, with a considerable baby boom occurring in regions such as Catalonia.

There was a strong baby boom in Czechoslovakia, but it was weak or absent in Poland, Bulgaria, Russia, Estonia and Lithuania, partly as a result of the Soviet famine of 1946–1947.

=== Latin America ===
There was also a baby boom in Latin American countries, excepting Brazil, Argentina and Uruguay. An increase in fertility was driven by a decrease in childlessness and, in most nations, by an increase in parity progression to second, third and fourth births. Its magnitude was largest in Costa Rica and Panama.

=== North America ===
In the United States and Canada, the baby boom was among the largest in the world. In 1946, live births in the U.S. surged from 222,721 in January to 339,499 in October. By the end of the 1940s, about 32 million babies had been born, compared with 24 million in the 1930s. In 1954, annual births first topped four million and did not drop below that figure until 1965, by which time four out of ten Americans were under the age of 20. As a result of the baby boom and traditional gender roles, getting married immediately after high school became commonplace and women increasingly encountered tremendous pressure to marry by the age of 20. A joke emerged at the time around comedic speculation that women were going to college to earn their "MRS degree" due to the increased marriage rate. The baby boom was stronger among American Catholics than among Protestants.

The exact beginning and end of the baby boom is debated. The U.S. Census Bureau defines baby boomers as those born between mid-1946 and mid-1964, although the U.S. birth rate began to increase in 1941, and decline after 1957. Deborah Carr considers baby boomers to be those born between 1944 and 1959, while Strauss and Howe place the Boom Generation at 1943 to 1960. In Canada, the baby boom is usually defined as occurring from 1947 to 1966. Canadian soldiers were repatriated later than American servicemen, and Canada's birthrate did not start to rise until 1947. Most Canadian demographers prefer to use the later date of 1966 as the boom's end year in that country. The later end to the boom in Canada than in the US has been ascribed to a later adoption of birth control pills.

In the United States, more babies were born during the seven years after 1948 than in the previous thirty, causing a shortage of teenage babysitters. At one point during this period, Madison, New Jersey only had 50 babysitters for its population of 8,000, dramatically increasing demand for sitters. In 1950, out of every $7 that a California couple spent to go to the movies, $5 went to paying a babysitter.

=== Oceania ===
The volume of baby boom was the largest in the world in New Zealand and second-largest in Australia. Like the US, the New Zealand baby boom was stronger among Catholics than Protestants.

The author and columnist Bernard Salt places the Australian baby boom between 1946 and 1961.

== See also ==
- Aging in the American workforce
- Counterculture of the 1960s
- History of the United States (1945–1964)
- Post-war displacement of Keynesianism
- Post-World War II economic expansion

== Bibliography ==
- Barkan, Elliott Robert. From All Points: America's Immigrant West, 1870s–1952, (2007) 598 pages
- Barrett, Richard E., Donald J. Bogue, and Douglas L. Anderton. The Population of the United States 3rd Edition (1997) compendium of data
- Carter, Susan B., Scott Sigmund Gartner, Michael R. Haines, and Alan L. Olmstead, eds. The Historical Statistics of the United States (Cambridge UP: 6 vol; 2006) vol 1 on population; available online; massive data compendium; online version in Excel
- Chadwick Bruce A. and Tim B. Heaton, eds. Statistical Handbook on the American Family. (1992)
- Easterlin, Richard A. The American Baby Boom in Historical Perspective, (1962), the single most influential study complete text online
- Easterlin, Richard A. Birth and Fortune: The Impact of Numbers on Personal Welfare (1987), by leading economist excerpt and text search
- Gillon, Steve. Boomer Nation: The Largest and Richest Generation Ever, and How It Changed America (2004), by leading historian. excerpt and text search
- Hawes Joseph M. and Elizabeth I. Nybakken, eds. American Families: a Research Guide and Historical Handbook. (Greenwood Press, 1991)
- Klein, Herbert S. A Population History of the United States. Cambridge University Press, 2004. 316 pp
- Macunovich, Diane J. Birth Quake: The Baby Boom and Its Aftershocks (2002) excerpt and text search
- Mintz Steven and Susan Kellogg. Domestic Revolutions: a Social History of American Family Life. (1988)
- Wells, Robert V. Uncle Sam's Family (1985), general demographic history
- Weiss, Jessica. To Have and to Hold: Marriage, the Baby Boom, and Social Change (2000) excerpt and text search
