= Advances in Life Course Research =

- Discipline: Life course research
- Language: English
- Edited by: L. Bernardi; Juho Härkönen

Publication details
- History: 2000–present
- Publisher: Elsevier
- Frequency: Quarterly
- Impact factor: 5.548 (2021)

Standard abbreviations
- ISO 4: Adv. Life Course Res.

Indexing
- ISSN: 1569-4909 (print); 1879-6974 (web)
- LCCN: 00229061
- OCLC no.: 311053442

Links
- Journal homepage; Online access; Online archive

Advances in Life Course Research is a quarterly peer-reviewed interdisciplinary scientific journal covering the field of life course research. It was established in 2000 and is published by Elsevier. The editors-in-chief are L. Bernardi (University of Lausanne) and Juho Härkönen (European University Institute). According to the Journal Citation Reports, the journal has a 2021 impact factor of 5.548.
