= Stereotype embodiment theory =

Theoretical model of how age stereotypes influence the health of older adults

Stereotype embodiment theory (SET) is a theoretical model first posited by psychologist Becca Levy to explain the process by which age stereotypes influence the health of older adults. There are multiple well-documented effects of age stereotypes on a number of cognitive and physical outcomes (including memory, cardiovascular reactivity, and longevity).

SET explains these findings according to a three-step process:

1. Age stereotypes are internalized from the host culture at a young age.
2. At some point, these age stereotype become "self stereotypes" about oneself as an aging individual.
3. These self-stereotypes are then consciously and unconsciously activated to exert their effects on individual health.

Underlying these three steps are SET's four main theoretical premises. According to Levy (2009): "The theory has four components: The stereotypes (a) become internalized across the lifespan, (b) can operate unconsciously, (c) gain salience from self-relevance, and (d) utilize multiple pathways."

Although this theory was developed to explain the operation of age stereotypes across the lifespan, it may also explain how other types of self-stereotypes operate, such as race stereotypes among African Americans and gender stereotypes among women.

== Theoretical premises ==
=== Internalization of stereotypes across the life span ===
Age stereotypes are internalized starting in early childhood. This process of early internalization is facilitated by the lack of resistances that are usually present when stereotypes are relevant to the personal identity of those exposed to them. In North America and Europe, these stereotypes tend to be negative.

This process continues on into early adulthood, where the acceptance and invocation of negative age stereotypes may represent short-term benefits in the form of greater social and economic resources being allocated to younger, rather than older, adults. Hence, younger adult workers tend to assume that older adult workers are less productive than their younger counterparts even when regular contact with older adult workers proves these assumptions inaccurate.

=== Unconscious operation of age stereotypes ===
Age stereotypes have been shown to operate unconsciously. For instance, a 1990 study by Purdue and Gurtman demonstrated that the associations made by their college-aged participants between certain negative traits and old age had an "automatic" component, such that, when their participants were subliminally primed (i.e., presented with stimuli at speeds sufficient for perception, but not recognition) with the word "old", they made associations with negative traits significantly faster than when they were subliminally primed with the word "young".

Unconscious operation of age stereotypes in older individuals was demonstrated for the first time by Levy (1996) in an experimental study that showed age stereotypes can impact memory of older individuals. These age stereotype-memory findings have been replicated in a number of different laboratories. Additional subliminal priming experiments have further linked the unconscious activation of age stereotypes to an individual's "will to live", such that older adults subliminally exposed to positive age stereotypes tended to accept life-prolonging interventions, while those exposed to negative age stereotypes tended to reject such interventions. Additionally, research conducted using the implicit-association test method has found further evidence for the presence of robust age stereotypes that operate independently of explicitly held age stereotypes.

Levy and Mahzarin Banaji are credited with coining the term "implicit ageism" to describe the unconscious operation of age stereotypes and age prejudice.

=== Salience gain from self-relevance ===
Levy (2003), in paraphrasing Snyder and Miene (1994), notes that "the old is the only outgroup that inevitably becomes an ingroup for individuals who live long enough" (pp. 33–54). In similar fashion, age stereotypes that at one point were directed outwardly at others who were perceived to be "old" are eventually directed inwardly at the self as age self-stereotypes when that self is recognized to be "old".

These age self-stereotypes continue to be predominantly negative and exert negative influences on cognitive and physical health. It is worth noting that positive age stereotypes do exist, and where they predominate they exert similarly positive effects on individual health.

=== Utilization of multiple pathways ===
The ways in which age stereotypes exert their influence on individual health can be quite varied. However, in general, it is hypothesized that these stereotypes exert their influence according to three primary mechanisms: psychological, behavioral, and physiological.

The psychological mechanism operates via self-fulfilling expectations. For example, in a large longitudinal study of twenty years, Levy and colleagues found that those with more positive self-perceptions of aging at baseline tended to have better functional health and greater longevity. Another study, to better establish the causal relationship between beliefs about one's own aging process and subsequent health outcomes, measured these outcomes as a product of randomly assigned, experimental primes. This study found that individuals performed better on cognitive and physical tasks when first subliminally primed with positive age stereotypes, and performed worse when first subliminally primed with negative age stereotypes. Additionally, this study demonstrated a "stereotype-matching effect" whereby the impact of positive and negative age stereotypes on physical and mental health was most greatly manifest when the content of the stereotypes corresponded to the particular health outcome under observation.

The behavioral mechanism operates via health practices. Specifically, when health problems are seen as inevitable consequences of growing old, such perceptions can lead older individuals to consider healthy behaviors as futile and may lead to reductions in self-efficacy. Conversely, Levy and Myers (2004) found that older adults with more positive self-perceptions of aging were significantly more likely to engage in health practices over time than those with more negative self-perceptions of aging.

The physiological mechanism operates via the autonomic nervous system. Cardiovascular reactivity, a measure of the autonomic nervous system's response to stress, is heightened in the presence of subliminally primed negative age stereotypes and reduced in the presence of subliminally primed positive age stereotypes. While occasional stress is not harmful, repeated elevation of cardiovascular response to stress can be quite detrimental to cardiac health. In fact, Levy and colleagues (2009) found that possessing negative age stereotypes in younger life can double the risk of having an adverse cardiovascular event after the age of 60.

== History ==
Aging has traditionally been explained in terms of physiological processes that lead to inevitable decline. However, more recent findings suggest that aging is a more subjective experience with health outcomes tied as intimately to social mores and behavior as they are to human biology. Additionally, when age stereotypes have been examined, such examinations have focused on the "targeters" (usually younger adults) rather than the targets (older adults). SET has emerged in response to and as a result of these gaps in the field of health and aging.

Until the emergence of SET, stereotype threat theory (STT) has provided the primary means of explaining how stereotypes impact targeted individuals. Unlike SET, STT attempts to explain these outcomes solely as a result of individuals' reactions against negative stereotypes directed at them from external sources. Thus, stereotype threat does not allow for the possibility of stereotype internalization and only operates in response to negative stereotypes directed against an aware target. Finally, STT assumes that the stereotype process is limited to short-term situations, as opposed to SET's assumption of a dynamic process that occurs across the lifespan.

In contrast to the theoretical assumptions laid out by STT, several lines of research have produced findings that support SET's suggestions that age stereotypes are internalized, can exert an effect regardless of the target's awareness, are effective in both negative and positive formulations, and can operate across the lifespan. O'Brien and Hummert (2006) compared SET and STT in a memory study that examined 2 divergent hypotheses–one predicted by SET and one predicted by STT–and found support for the one predicted by SET.

Other relevant results that have laid the foundation for the development of SET are summarized here:

- Age stereotypes are internalized: In a study by Donlon, Ashman, and Levy (2005), it was demonstrated that older individuals with greater lifetime exposure to television (a source of predominantly negative age stereotypes) possessed more negative age stereotypes, thus suggesting that age stereotypes are internalized from the individual's host culture.
- Both positive and negative age stereotypes exert an effect: In a cross-cultural study by Levy and Langer (1994), memory performance was compared among three groups with varying degrees of negative versus positive age stereotypes. In order of increasing negativity, they were: a) mainland Chinese; b) American Deaf; and c) American hearing. As predicted, the mainland Chinese elderly group outperformed the American deaf elderly group, who, in turn, outperformed the American hearing elderly group. This finding suggests that cognitive outcomes are indeed sensitive to the ratio of negative to positive stereotypes. Additional confirmatory studies have further demonstrated the independent and opposite effects of positive versus negative age stereotypes.
- Age stereotypes can operate unconsciously: In a study by Levy (1996), it was found that age stereotypes can operate without awareness among older individuals. It was shown that, by activating age stereotypes subliminally, negative age stereotypes can worsen older individuals' memory performance, whereas positive age stereotypes can improve their memory performance. Nosek and Banaji (2002) demonstrated that explicit and implicit beliefs each operate independently of the other. In fact, of the 15 belief categories examined (including race and gender), age was found to have the lowest correlation between explicit and implicit beliefs. Additionally, a follow-up study by Nosek et al. (2002) found that, while both explicit and implicit attitudes towards aging were negative, implicitly held attitudes tended to be even more negative than explicitly held attitudes.
- Age stereotypes are internalized and operate across the lifespan: In a longitudinal study by Levy, Zonderman, Slade, and Ferrucci (2009), it was demonstrated that age stereotypes internalized across the life course could have real health consequences. In their study, it was found that individuals who held negative age stereotypes earlier in life had a greater likelihood of experiencing cardiovascular events as much as 38 years earlier than individuals with more positive age stereotypes.
