= Ellen Langer =

American psychologist (born 1947)

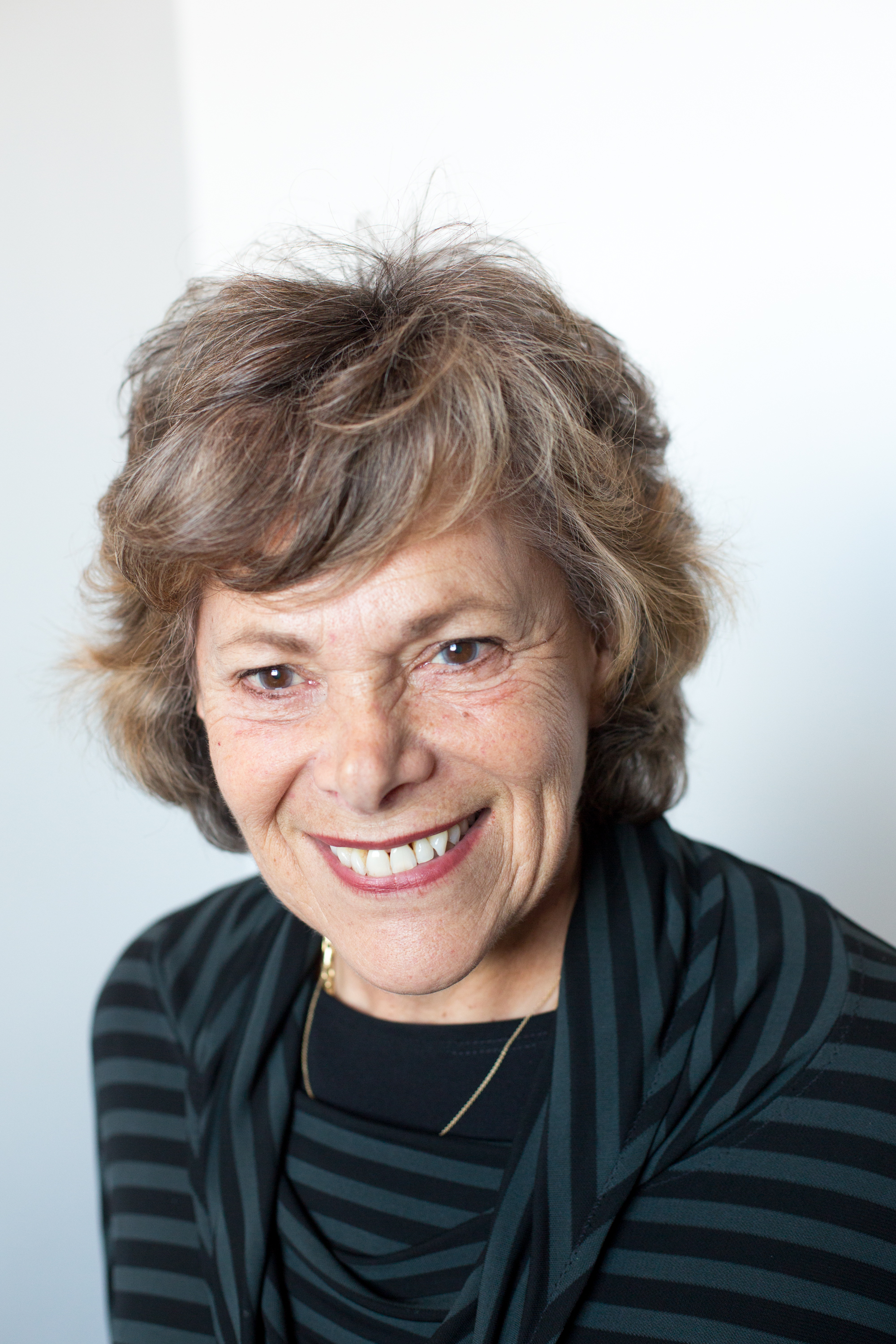
- Langer in 2013
- Born: March 25, 1947 (age 79); The Bronx, New York, U.S.
- Education: New York University (BA); Yale University (PhD)
- Occupation: Psychology professor
- Scientific career
- Fields: Psychology
- Notable students: Alia Crum; Adam Grant; Becca Levy

Ellen Jane Langer (/ˈlæŋər/; born March 25, 1947) is an American psychologist and professor of psychology at Harvard University. In 1981, she became the first woman to be tenured in psychology at Harvard. She has been called the "mother of mindfulness" and the "mother of positive psychology". Langer studies the illusion of control, decision-making, aging, and mindfulness theory. Her most influential work is Counterclockwise, published in 2009, the first test of her mind/body unity theory. Her most recent book, The Mindful Body: Thinking Our Way to Chronic Health, published in 2023, argues for the enormous control we have over our health based on mind/body unity.

== Early life and education ==
Langer was born in The Bronx, New York. She grew up in a two-bedroom Yonkers apartment she shared with her parents and older sister. She received a bachelor's degree in psychology from New York University, where she initially majored in chemistry. Langer decided to major in psychology after taking a Psych 101 course with Phillip Zimbardo at NYU. She received her Ph.D. in social and clinical psychology from Yale University in 1974.

== Career ==
Langer has been called mother of positive psychology and the "mother of mindfulness." Her work helped to presage mind/body medicine,, which now has "considerable evidence that an array of mind-body therapies can be used as effective adjuncts to conventional medical treatment." She has co-authored experimental research indicating a connection between time perception and wound healing.

She has published over 200 articles and academic texts, was published in The New York Times, and discussed her works on Good Morning America. Her studies are required reading in many introductory psychology courses at universities across the United States.

Langer has been called a trailblazer who initiated a transformative shift in perspective. Her Harvard colleague, psychologist Daniel Gilbert, stated in the 1989 anthology Unintended Thought, "[Langer] pointed out that social inference is not always a conscious and deliberate act; rather it is often the province of mindless automata." He further noted, "This clarion call was widely appreciated, and if Langer did not quite set the stage for a psychology of unconscious social inference, she at least rented the theatre."

=== Aging ===
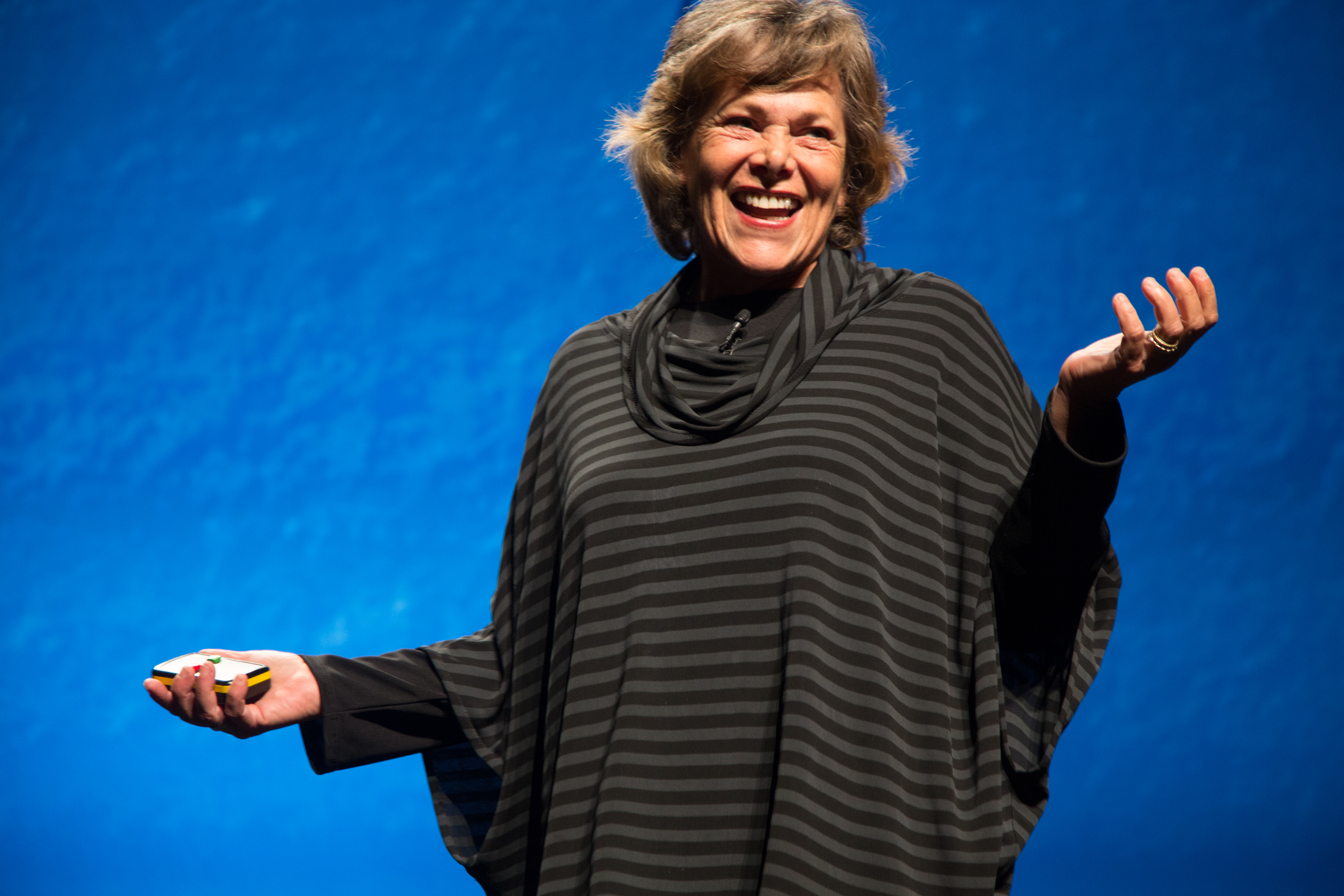
Langer at PopTech 2013

Langer and colleagues have conducted multiple forms of research to promote the idea of the flexibility of aging. Her well known 1979 Counterclockwise Study found that when elderly men were temporarily placed in a setting that recreated their past, their health improved, and they even looked younger. This study was originally published by Oxford University Press and later described in her best seller, Mindfulness. It is the basis of what is now called Reminiscence Therapy. The study was the basis of a British Academy of Film and Television Awards nominated BBC series, The Young Ones. The original study was published in a chapter of a book edited by Langer published by Oxford University Press. In 2018, the counterclockwise study was repeated in Italy, but the results have not been published as of 2024. Langer and colleagues have explored the theory of mind/body in other ways.

Other work has shown that rewarding behaviors and following completion of memory tasks improves memory. A study showed that among nursing home patients, simply taking care of a plant improves mental and physical health, as well as life expectancy. By having chambermaids call their everyday activity "exercise" rather than "labor," Langer found that the chambermaids experienced a myriad of health benefits including: "a decrease in their systolic blood pressure, weight, and waist-to-hip ratio."

=== Mindfulness ===
Langer is known for her contributions to the study of mindfulness and of mindless behaviour, which provided the basis for many studies focused on individual differences in unconscious behavior and decision-making processes in humans. Although she initially studied meditation as well, she grew to focus more on the study of mindfulness without meditation.

In 1989, she published Mindfulness, arguing for the widespread influence and application of mindfulness to business, education, science, art, and interpersonal relationships, and she became known as the "mother of mindfulness". Langer defines mindfulness as "the simple act of noticing new things." The Langer Mindfulness Scale aims to proxy for measures of this form of mindfulness. Langer says that mindfulness can help teach that "uncertainty is the rule rather than the exception."

== Awards ==
In 1980, she was the recipient of a Guggenheim Fellowship. Other honors and awards include:

- Distinguished Contributions to Psychology in the Public Interest Award (American Psychological Association)
- NYU Alumni Achievement Award
- Liberty Science Center Genius Award
- Distinguished Research Achievement Award from the American Psychological Association (Division of Adult Development and Aging)
- Distinguished Contributions of Basic Science to Applied Psychology award from the American Association of Applied and Preventive Psychology
- James McKeen Cattel Award
- Gordon Allport Intergroup Relations Prize.

== Bibliography (selection) ==
- Langer, Ellen J. (1989). Mindfulness. Reading, MA: Addison Wesley. ISBN 978-0-201-52341-6.
- Langer, Ellen J. (1997). The Power of Mindful Learning. Reading, MA: Addison-Wesley. ISBN 978-0-201-33991-8.
- Langer, Ellen J. (2005). On Becoming an Artist. New York: Ballantine Books. ISBN 978-0-345-45629-8.
- Langer, Ellen J. (2009). Counter clockwise: mindful health and the power of possibility. New York: Ballantine Books. ISBN 978-0-345-50204-9.
- Langer, Ellen J. (2023). The Mindful Body: Thinking Our Way to Chronic Health. New York: Ballantine Books. ISBN 978-0-593-49794-4.
