= Alia Crum =

American psychologist

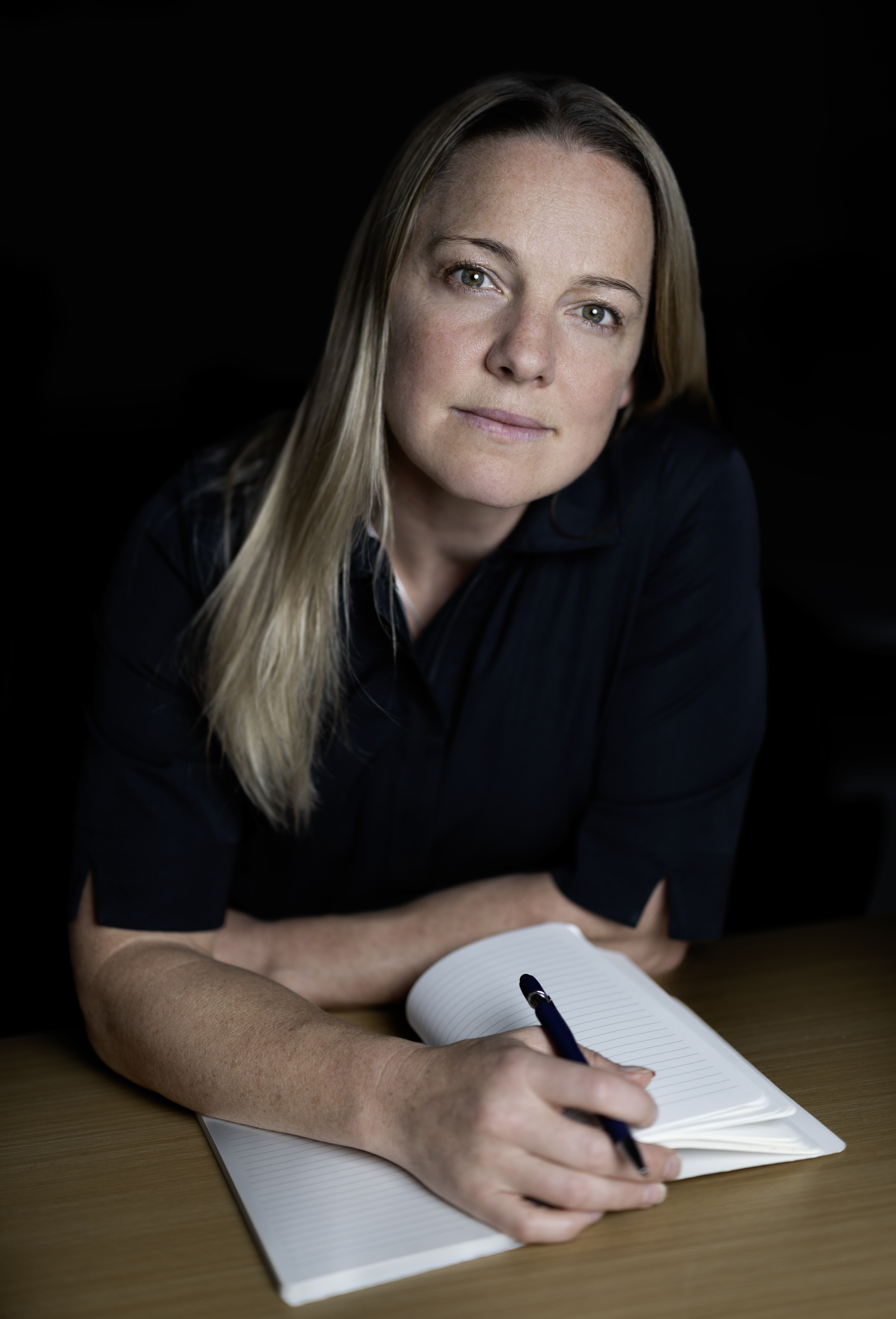
- Crum at Stanford in 2025
- Education: Harvard University; Yale University
- Known for: Influence of mindset on physical and mental health
- Scientific career
- Fields: Psychology
- Workplaces: Stanford University
- Thesis: ReThinking Stress: The Role of Mindsets in Determining the Stress Response (2012)
- Doctoral advisor: Peter Salovey
- Notable students: Katie Ledecky
- Website: https://www.aliacrum.com/ https://mbl.stanford.edu/

Alia Joy Crum is an American psychologist who is the principal investigator of the Stanford Mind and Body Lab.

Crum researches how mindsets affect human behaviour as well as physical and mental health outcomes. She has received widespread media coverage for her work.

== Early life and education ==
Crum grew up in Aspen, Colorado. Her father worked in conflict and stress mediation and her mother, in children's theatre. Crum was interested in sports from an early age. She was an elite gymnast as a child and later played ice hockey competitively at Harvard. She was drawn to psychology from her experience in sports, noticing that mental and emotional factors play a huge role in athletic performance.

As an athlete, I was always fascinated by the power of the mind and, in particular, how a person having the same physical capacity from one day to the next could have completely different results depending on their mental state.

— Alia Crum, Mindsets: Q&A with Dr. Alia Crum, Stanford Psychology

She received a B.A. from Harvard University in 2005 and a Ph.D. from Yale University in 2012. Her undergraduate thesis is Think and grow fit: the mind-body connection between exercise and health, supervised by Ellen J. Langer. Her Ph.D. thesis is entitled ReThinking Stress: The Role of Mindsets in Determining the Stress Response. Her advisor was Peter Salovey.

== Career and research ==
From 2012 to 2014, Crum worked as a postdoctoral fellow at Columbia University. Since 2014, she is an assistant professor of psychology at Stanford University where she leads the Stanford Mind and Body Lab.

Crum was to be a key speaker at the Mindset 2021 conference event. In 2018, she spoke at the Annual Meeting of the World Economic Forum in Davos. She has also given a TED talk.

Crum studies how psychological mindsets and perceptions of events can alter the body's physical response to these events. The goal of this work is to apply findings to healthcare to improve wellness and complement medical treatments. Much of her research is inspired by the placebo effect and how beliefs about a cure can improve its effectiveness. Even knowingly taking a placebo can be beneficial, suggesting that people do not need to be tricked for these kinds of effects to occur. Intentionally maintaining a positive mindset can provide relief.

=== Mindset and medical treatments ===
Crum has looked into how modifying the mindset of cancer patients could positively impact their mental health, from diagnosis to remission. A cancer diagnosis represents a heavy emotional stress for patients and families, leading to high rates of depression and anxiety. By intentionally perceiving the diagnosis as manageable rather than catastrophic and focusing on how resilient the body can be, patients may be able to improve their mental well-being.

In the case of oral immunotherapy to treat food allergies, patients are exposed to small doses of allergens to desensitise them. The small allergic reaction is unpleasant, and patients become anxious about completing treatments. If symptoms are seen as signs the body is reacting positively to build tolerance, the treatment process goes more smoothly.

More generally, Crum advocates for better doctor-patient interactions and psychosocial interventions during treatment as these can improve patient experiences through trust, leading to a more positive mindset. Patients whose doctors give warm reassurances experience better healing. Being aware of the treatment occurring and knowing what consequences to expect also helps patients heal.

=== Mindset and physical fitness ===
Her research has found that reframing regular work activities or chores as physical exercise led to better overall fitness levels among participants, even if their other lifestyle habits did not change. Crum also reviewed national survey data from between 1990 and 2011 containing information about physical activity and found that perceiving oneself to be active could be linked to higher life expectancy.

In response to the rising popularity of DNA testing, Crum investigated how learning about genetic risk factors for two health issues, obesity and exercise ability, in fact influenced the likelihood of the issues developing. Those who believed they were at high risk had worse outcomes. The concern is that the DNA test results could become self-fulfilling prophecies if not delivered in the right way. Other studies are assessing the potential for gene testing to motivate healthy lifestyle changes.

=== Mindset and nutrition ===
Crum determined that the perception of a food item as more or less indulgent could influence the production of the hormone ghrelin. Similarly, believing that a beverage contains caffeine can increase blood pressure.

Crum has also analysed top-grossing movies to categorise the types of foods depicted, noting that many of the most common items are not healthy and do not reinforce healthy eating habits. Also of note was that compared with UK standards, the US film rating system is much more lax in its regulations surrounding messaging aimed at children. To encourage healthy eating habits, Crum worked with the Stanford dining hall to experiment with the labelling and identification of healthy foods. They found that positive, "flavour-forward" messaging led to more diners choosing vegetable dishes.

=== Mindset and stress ===
During the COVID-19 pandemic, Crum's research group surveyed the perceptions of Norwegians living above the Arctic Circle about winter and the isolation it can entail. Embracing a positive mindset and being grateful for enjoyable opportunities was linked to overall happiness. This is consistent with Crum's previous work on stress and how acknowledging it, then acting to strengthen the values that are being threatened, can help to overcome it. Stressful experiences can lead to personal growth if well-managed. Crum and Thomas Crum recommend a three-step approach of seeing, owning and using the stress response.

== Awards and honours ==
- 2020 Early Career Award, Social Personality Health Network
- 2019 Early Career Researcher Award, International Positive Psychology Association
- 2018 Phi Beta Kappa Teaching Prize
- 2017 Rising Star Award, Association for Psychological Science
- 2016 NIH New Innovator Award
- 2005 Seymour E. and Ruth B. Harris Prize for Honors Thesis in the Social Sciences
- 2005 Thomas Temple Hoopes Prize
- 2005 Gordon W. Allport Prize

== Personal life ==
Crum is married and has a daughter.
