= Deborah Carr =

American sociologist

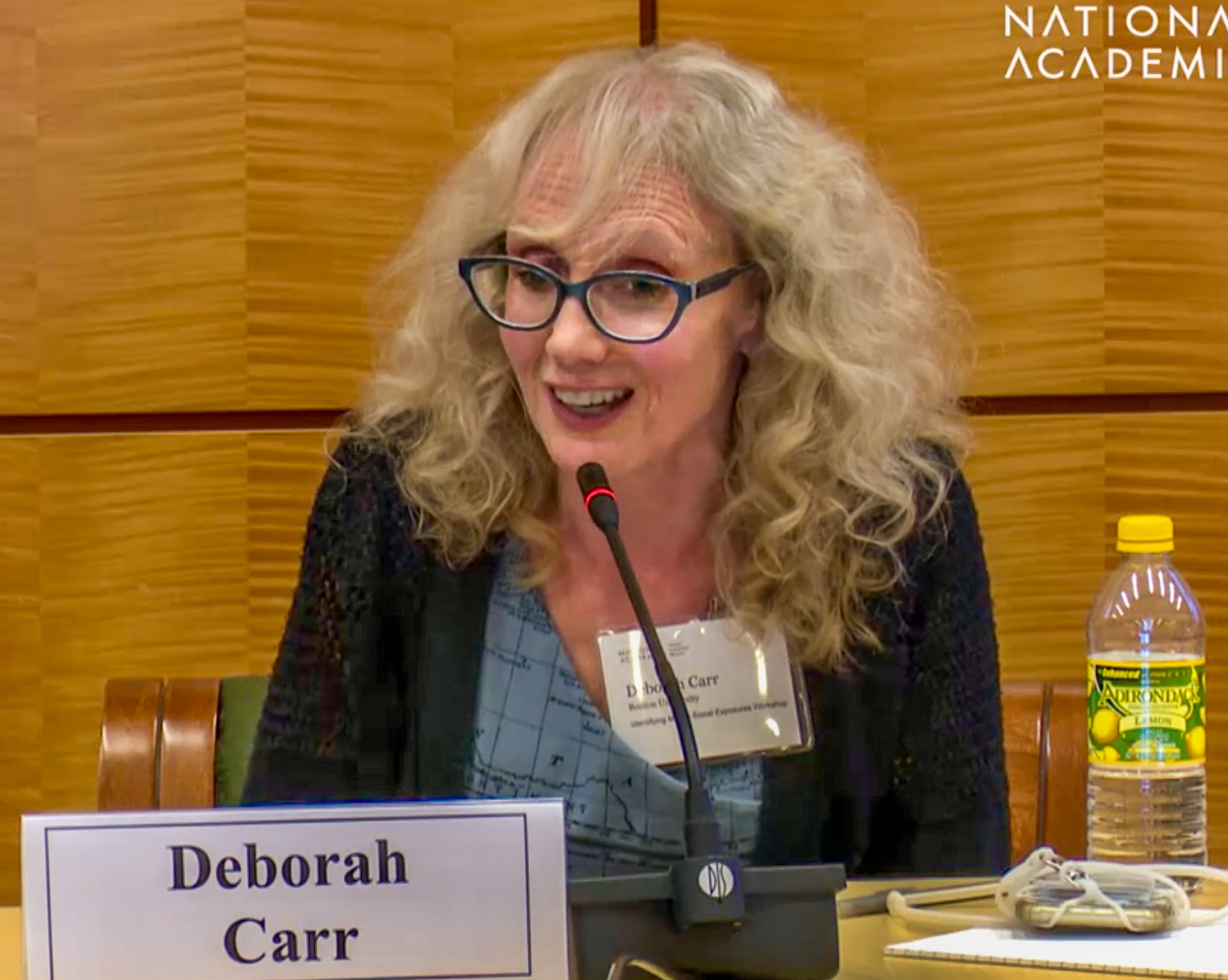
- Scientific career
- Education: University of Wisconsin-Madison (PhD)
- Fields: Sociology
- Institutions: Boston University; Rutgers University; University of Michigan
- Thesis: The fulfillment of career goals over the life course and midlife mental health
- Doctoral advisor: Robert M. Hauser

Deborah Carr is a U.S. sociologist, academic, and author. She is the Arts & Sciences Distinguished Professor of Sociology and the inaugural director of the Center for Innovation in Social Science at Boston University. In 2024, she was elected to the American Academy of Arts and Sciences.

== Education ==
Carr grew up in Cranston, RI and graduated from Cranston High School East. She earned her B.A. in sociology-based human relations at Connecticut College and received her PhD in sociology from the University of Wisconsin-Madison in 1997, where her dissertation focused on whether the fulfillment of occupational goals influences mental health at midlife.

== Career ==
=== Academic positions ===
Carr has held faculty positions at University of Michigan, University of Wisconsin, and Rutgers University, where she was acting director of the Institute for Health, Health Care Policy & Aging Research. In September 2021, she was appointed as the inaugural director of the Center for Innovation in Social Science at Boston University. In May 2024, she was awarded the title of Arts & Sciences Distinguished Professor by the Dean of the Boston University College of Arts & Sciences.

=== Editorial positions ===
In January 2023, she was appointed as the editor-in-chief of the Journal of Health and Social Behavior. Prior to this, she held the position of editor-in-chief of the Journal of Gerontology: Social Sciences from 2015 to 2020. Additionally, she has served as deputy editor for both Social Psychology Quarterly and the Journal of Marriage and Family, as well as trends editor for Contexts.

=== Leadership in major surveys ===
She has led several surveys, including her current role as the principal investigator of the National Longitudinal Survey of Youth 1979 (NLSY79) and co-investigator of the Midlife Development in the United States (MIDUS). Additionally, she served as the principal investigator of the New Jersey End of Life Study and Wisconsin Study of Families and Loss (WISTFL), a follow-up to Wisconsin Longitudinal Study. She has also chaired the Board of Overseers of the General Social Survey.

== Research ==
Carr is a life course sociologist who specializes in utilizing survey data and quantitative methods to investigate social factors affecting health and well-being in later life. Her research focuses on four key areas: the effects of family-related stressors, such as divorce and widowhood, on health and well-being in older adulthood, the social, psychological, and interpersonal consequences of the stigma associated with obesity, the impact of climate change on the health and well-being of older adults, and issues related to death, dying, and bereavement. Her work has been funded by National Institutes of Health, Robert Wood Johnson Foundation, and RRF Foundation on Aging, among other organizations. She has authored several books including Aging in America (2023, University of California Press), Golden Years? Social Inequality in Late Life (2019, Russell Sage), and Worried Sick (2014, Rutgers University Press).

== Recognition ==
- Arts & Sciences Distinguished Professor, Boston University College of Arts and Sciences, 2024
- Elected member, American Academy of Arts and Sciences, 2024
- Mentoring Award, Section on Aging and the Life Course, American Sociological Association, 2023
- Matilda White Riley Distinguished Scholar Award, Section on Aging and the Life Course, American Sociological Association, 2023
- Richard Kalish Innovation Publication Award for Golden Years? Social Inequality in Later Life (2019), Gerontological Society of America, 2020
- Member, Sociological Research Association, 2008
- Fellow, Gerontological Society of America, 2006
