= Parity progression ratios =

Measure used in demography to study fertility

A parity progression ratios (PPR) is a measure commonly used in demography to study fertility. The PPR is simply the proportion of women with a certain number of children who go on to have another child. Calculating the PPR, also known as $a_x$, can be achieved by using the following formula:

$a_x = \text{(women with at least } x+1 \text { children ever born) }/\text{ (women with at least } x \text{ children ever born)}$

In more developed countries where two-child families are seen as the norm $a_2$ (or the proportion of women with two children who go on to have a third) is of critical importance in determining overall fertility levels.

$a_0$ is simply the proportion of women who become mothers.
