= Juho Härkönen =

Juho Härkönen is a Finnish academic, currently professor of sociology in the Department of Political and Social Sciences at the European University Institute (EUI) in Florence, Italy.

At the EUI, he is director of graduate studies for the Department of Political and Social Sciences since 2020, and co-director of the Comparative Life Course and Inequality Research Centre (CLIC) and of Florence Population Studies (FloPS). Härkönen holds a PhD in political and social sciences (2007) and a Master of Research (2003) from the European University Institute, and a Master of Social Sciences (2001) from the University of Turku.

== Career ==
Prior to joining the European University Institute in February 2018, he held various positions at Stockholm University. From November 2016 to February 2018 he was Professor of Sociology, from October 2012 to November 2016 he was university lecturer in sociology, and from August 2009 to September 2012 he was researcher in the Demography Unit and the Institute for Social Research. He was also visiting professor at the University of Turku from 2010 to 2018, and a postdoctoral associate at Yale University in the department of sociology, Center for Research on Inequalities and the Life Course from September 2007 to August 2009.

He has coordinated and has been involved in several research projects funded by the Academy of Finland, European Commission (Framework Programme 7 and Horizon 2020, Norface, and the Swedish Research Council for Health, Working Life and Welfare.

== Editorships ==
Härkönen holds editorial positions for various journals, these include: editor of Advances in Life Course Research (since 2017), Research on Finnish Society (2014 to 2017); special issue editor of European Journal of Population (Special Issue on Family Dynamics and Children's Life Chances with Fabrizio Bernardi in 2017), Scandinavian Journal of Public Health (Special Issue on Register-Based Research with J. Björk, K. Scott, A. Berglund, S. Öberg in 2017); member of scientific review board of Demographic Research (2012 to 2015); member of editorial board: Sosiologia (2001 to 2004); and referee of 32 journals and publishers.

== Research interests ==
Some of his research interests include:

- Life course research
- Causes and consequences of family dynamics and structure
- Social stratification and comparative research
- Stratification in prenatal smoking, antecedents and outcomes of divorce, occupational careers, and health
- Family demography

== Publications ==
- Härkönen, J. & J. Dronkers. 2006. Stability and change in the educational gradient of divorce. A comparison of seventeen countries. European Sociological Review 22(5):501-17.
- Dronkers, J. & J. Härkönen. 2008. The intergenerational transmission of divorce in cross-national perspective: Results from the Fertility and Families Surveys. Population Studies 62(3):273-88.
- Härkönen, J., H. Kaymakcalan, P. Mäki & A. Taanila. 2012. Prenatal health, educational attainment, and intergenerational inequality: The Northern Finland Birth Cohort 1966 Study. Demography 49(2):525-52.
- Manzoni, A., J. Härkönen, & K.U. Mayer. 2014. Moving on? A growth-curve analysis of occupational attainment and career progression patterns in West Germany. Social Forces 92(4): 1285–1312.
- Härkönen, J. 2014. Birth order effects on educational attainment and educational transitions in West Germany. European Sociological Review 30(2): 166–179.
- Härkönen, J., Lindberg, M., Karlsson, L., Karlsson, H., & Scheinin, N. 2018. Education is the strongest socioeconomic predictor of smoking in pregnancy. Addiction 113(6): 1117–26.
- Boertien, D., & J. Härkönen. 2018. Why does women's education stabilize marriages? The role of marital attractions and barriers to divorce. Demographic Research 38: 1241–76.
