= Life course research =

Interdisciplinary social science field

Life course research is an interdisciplinary field in the social and behavioral sciences. Developed during the 1960s, it aims to study human development over the entire life span. As such, it brings together aspects of human development that had previously only been studied separately. In the 1970s, scholars first started to commonly refer to their field as "life course research". The field includes research conceptualizing the life course as one of many different concepts, including developmental processes, cultural constructs, and demographic accounts.
