= Becca Levy =

American psychologist

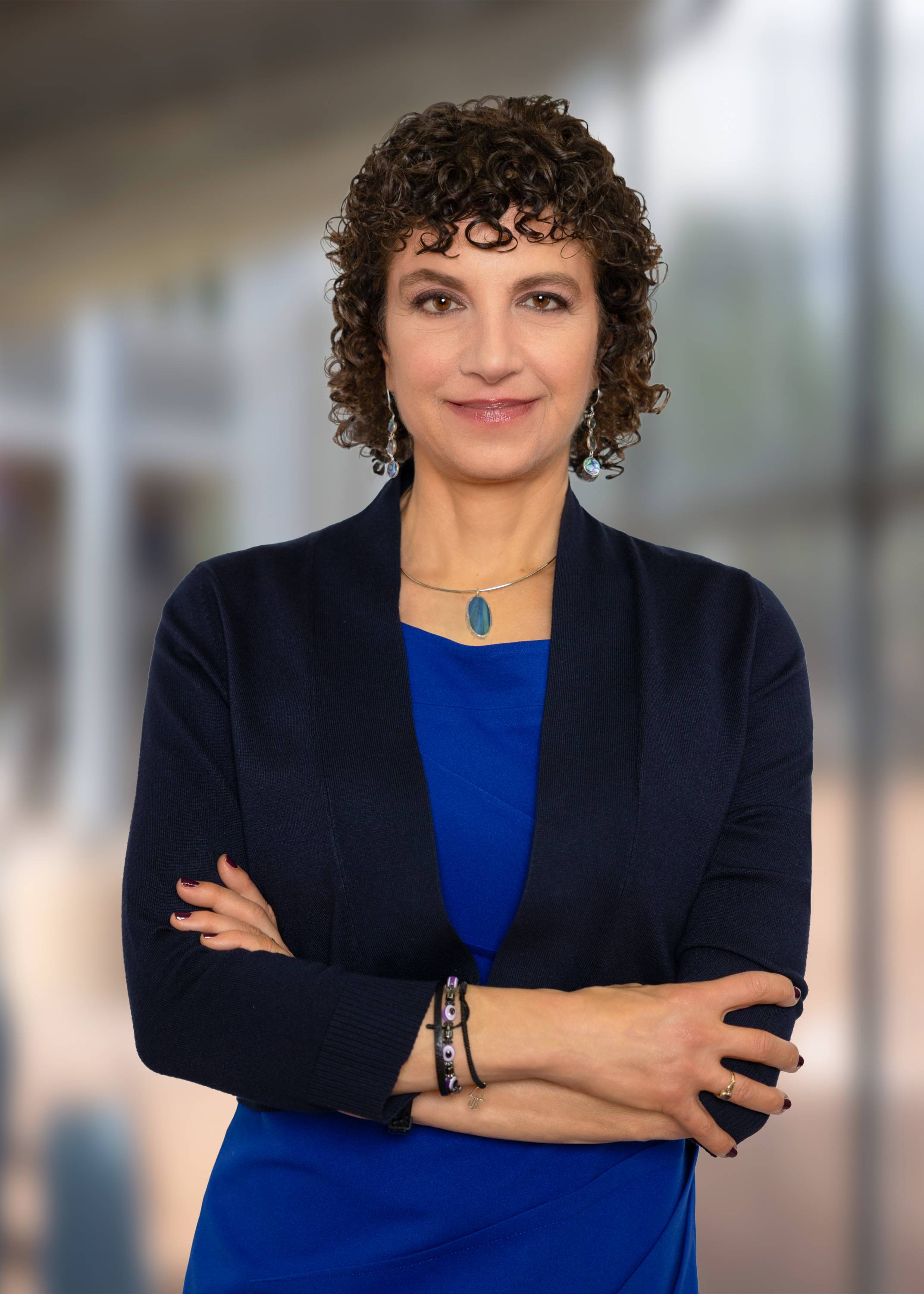
- Born: Atlanta, Georgia, US
- Known for: Research on aging stereotype embodiment theory

Academic background
- Education: University of Michigan; Harvard University

Academic work
- Discipline: epidemiology psychology public health
- Sub-discipline: social gerontology
- Institutions: Yale University
- Website: https://ysph.yale.edu/profile/becca_levy/

Becca R. Levy is an American psychologist who is a professor of epidemiology (Social and Behavioral Sciences) at Yale School of Public Health and professor of psychology at Yale University. She is a leading researcher in the fields of social gerontology and psychology of aging. She is credited with creating the field of how age beliefs, which are assimilated from the culture, impact the health of older individuals. The Dean of Columbia School of Public Health describes Levy as "a pioneer" in the "growing body of impressive research showing that our attitudes toward aging affect our health, our resilience in the face of adversity, and our very survival."

She is an elected fellow to the American Psychological Association, the Association of Psychological Science, and the Gerontological Society of America.

== Career ==
Levy was born in Atlanta, Georgia. She studied psychology and Near Eastern studies at the University of Michigan, where she received a BA with Highest Distinction. She received her MA and PhD in psychology from Harvard University. She trained as a postdoctoral fellow at Harvard Medical School in the Division on Aging and Department of Social Medicine. Levy then became assistant professor at the Yale School of Public Health. She is now Professor and Director of the Laboratory of Psychosocial Determinants of Aging Health at the Yale School of Public Health. She is also a professor in the Department of Psychology at Yale University.

== Research ==
Levy has created an area of research that focuses on the extent to which the aging process is a product of society. She has examined this in a series of innovative studies that demonstrate culture-based positive and negative age stereotypes of older persons have beneficial and detrimental influences, respectively, on a wide range of health conditions. Her research has demonstrated that several of the adverse health conditions assumed to be solely and inevitably a result of aging are, in fact, influenced by negative age stereotypes.

The studies in which she was first author have found that age stereotypes contribute to (a) physical outcomes, such as longevity, Alzheimer's disease biomarkers, physical function, cardiovascular events, and delayed physical recovery; (b) mental-health outcomes, such as stress levels, will to live, and psychiatric disorders; (c) risky health behaviors, such as rejecting prescribed medications and obesity; and (d) cognitive outcomes, such as dementia incidence and memory.

Levy's studies also show that positive age stereotypes can benefit the health of older persons. Her finding that positive age beliefs can increase older persons' longevity has become one of the most cited findings about old age. She has also demonstrated that positive age stereotypes can be enhanced and negative age stereotypes can be diminished through interventions.

This body of research has formed the basis for her stereotype embodiment theory (SET), which posits that the age stereotypes of one's culture are internalized from childhood, reinforced throughout the lifespan, eventually become self-relevant, and then influence health in old age through psychological, behavioral, and physiological pathways. According to SET, these stereotypes can operate implicitly. Levy and Mahzarin Banaji are credited with coining the term "implicit ageism".

Levy's research findings about the impact of age stereotypes on older persons' health have been reproduced by scientists in five continents and supported by numerous meta-analyses. Her ground-breaking studies utilize a variety of complementary methodologies, including experimental, longitudinal, and cross-cultural approaches.

Levy has contributed over 160 articles and chapters to psychological, gerontological, and medical journals and books. Her research has been supported by the National Institute on Aging, National Heart, Lung, and Blood Institute, National Science Foundation, Donaghue Medical Research Foundation, and Brookdale Foundation.

Levy's studies have had an impact on improving the well-being of older persons. She conducted the first study to show the economic impact of ageism on the health of older persons. In that study it was found that the financial cost of ageism on health in one year in the United States was $63 billion. She testified before the U.S. Senate Special Committee on Aging about the harmful impact of ageism in popular media and marketing. Her findings provided the basis for amicus briefs in age-discrimination cases at the U.S. Supreme Court. The American Psychological Association advocated a historic resolution against ageism that used her research as an evidence base, citing 11 of her studies.

Levy's findings provided the rationale for a World Health Organization Campaign to End Ageism, supported by 194 countries, in which she is a scientific advisor. Levy is credited with creating the term “aging liberation” to refer to how ageism can be overcome and aging can be embraced on both an individual and a collective level.

Levy was invited by Robert Butler, who coined the term ageism and who was the founding director of the National Institute on Aging, to join his working group to address ageism in America. The New York Times journalist Paula Span writes about Levy’s relationship to Butler that “One could argue that she is his heir.”

Her studies on health and aging has been featured in The New York Times, and NPR,, Washington Post, CNN Health, The Wall Street Journal, U.S. News & World Report, Newsweek, and Times Magazine, as well as international media, such as The Guardian, Der Spiegel, and the BBC.

== Awards ==
- Baltes Distinguished Research Achievement Award for Exceptional Theoretical and Empirical Contributions to the Psychological Science of Aging from the American Psychological Association
- Ewald W. Busse Research Award for Excellence in Social Behavioral Sciences (International Association of Gerontology and Geriatrics)
- Donaghue Investigator Award (Patrick and Catherine Weldon Donaghue Medical Research Foundation)
- Margret M. Baltes Award for Outstanding Early Career Achievement in Social and Behavioral Gerontology (Margret M. and Paul Baltes Foundation and the Gerontological Society of America)
- Springer Award for Early Career Achievement in Research on Adult Development and Aging (American Psychological Association)
- Brookdale National Fellowship for Leadership in Aging (Brookdale Foundation)
- Richard Kalish Innovative Publication Award (Gerontological Society of America)

== Selected publications ==
=== Books ===
- Breaking the Age Code: How Your Age Beliefs Determine How Long and Well You Live (HarperCollins, 2022)

=== Journal articles ===
- Levy, B. R., Slade, M., Kunkel, S., & Kasl, S. (2002). Longevity increased by positive self-perceptions of aging. Journal of Personality and Social Psychology, 83, 261–270.
- Levy, B. R. (2009). Stereotype embodiment: A psychosocial approach to aging. Current Directions in Psychological Science, 18, 332–336.
- Levy, B. R., Zonderman, A., Slade, M. D., Ferrucci, L. (2009). Negative age stereotypes held earlier in life predict cardiovascular events in later life. Psychological Science, 20, 296–298.
- Levy, B. R., Slade, M. D., Murphy, T. E., & Gill, T. M. (2012). Association between positive age stereotypes and recovery from disability in older persons. JAMA, 308, 1972–1973.
- Levy, B. R., Pilver, C., Chung, P. H., & Slade, M. D. (2014). Subliminal strengthening: Improving older individuals' physical function over time with an implicit-age-stereotype intervention. Psychological Science, 25, 2127–2135
- Levy, B. R., Ferrucci, L., Zonderman, A. B., Slade, M. D., Troncoso, J., & Resnick, S. M. (2016). A culture–brain link: Negative age stereotypes predict Alzheimer's disease biomarkers. Psychology and Aging, 31, 82–88.
- Levy, B. R., Slade, M. D., Pietrzak, R. H., & Ferrucci, L. (2018). Positive age beliefs protect against dementia even among elders with high-risk gene. PLOS ONE, 13, e191004.
- Levy, B. R., Slade, M. D., Chang, E. S., Kannoth, S., & Wang, S. Y. (2020). Ageism amplifies cost and prevalence of health conditions. Gerontologist, 60, 174-181.
- Levy, B. R. & Slade, M. D. (2023). Role of positive age beliefs in recovery from mild cognitive impairment among older persons. JAMA Network Open, 6, e237707.
- Levy, B. R., & Slade, M. D. (2026). Aging Redefined: Cognitive and Physical Improvement with Positive Age Beliefs. Geriatrics, 11(2), 28. https://doi.org/10.3390/geriatrics11020028
