= German Ageing Survey =

The German Ageing Survey (DEAS) is a main source of information about ageing and old age as a stage of life in Germany. It is a nationally representative, cross-sectional and longitudinal survey of people in the second half of life (i. e. aged 40 and over). The comprehensive study of people in their mid- and older adulthood provides individual data for use both in social and behavioural scientific research and in reporting on social developments. The data is thus a source of information for political decision makers, the general public and for scientific research. The DEAS allows to form a comprehensive picture of life situations and life contexts of old and ageing people in Germany and to respond to current political and academic questions.

== Funding, history and structure of the study ==
The German Ageing Survey (DEAS) is funded by the Federal Ministry for Family Affairs, Senior Citizens, Women and Youth (BMFSFJ). The first survey wave was conducted in 1996. It was designed and carried out by the research group on ageing and the life course from the Freie Universität Berlin, the research group on psychogerontology of the University of Nijmegen and infas Institute for Applied Social Sciences, Bonn. From 2000 onwards, the German Centre of Gerontology (DZA) was responsible for the implementation and further development of the project. The second survey wave of DEAS followed in 2002, the third in 2008, the fourth in 2011, the fifth in 2014, the sixth in 2017, and the seventh in 2020. The data assessments are furthermore carried out by infas Institute for Applied Social Sciences. Starting from 2008, the DEAS panel is conducted every three years. A new cross-sectional sample is drawn every six years. This approach enables the investigation of social change as well as individual development over a 24-year span. A book containing about women and men in the second half of life, containing the key findings of the sixth wave, was published in 2019. Since 2020 several volumes of the DZA Aktuell, based on the seventh wave and concerning the effects of the corona pandemic on older people, have been published.

== Main research areas ==
Covering a broad spectrum of topics, the DEAS reflects the complex life situations and life concepts of the German population in the second half of life. The survey’s interdisciplinary conception allows for the linking of gerontological, sociological, psychological, socio-political, nursing science, and economic issues. In every new wave the questions aim to balance actuality and continuity. On the one hand, adaptation of the questionnaire to accommodate new insights makes it possible to respond promptly to urgent political and academic questions. On the other hand, the retention of a sizable number of questions from the previous waves ensures comparability and the monitoring of long-term developments. The following topics are examined:

- employment, retirement, transitions and age assurance
- Income, assets, old-age poverty, inheritances
  - Housing and neighbourhood
  - volunteering, participation
  - Digitalisation and technology
  - Social relationships: Family, partnership, friendship, loneliness
  - Informal help, support and care by relatives
  - Health, well-being, life satisfaction
  - Age images, ageism, attitudes

This broad spectrum of topics makes it necessary to examine them as a whole and to analyse their interrelationship and interactions during the life course. Some examples for this are issues relating to quality of life in old age and social inequality.

== Sampling ==
The German Ageing Survey enables analyses of cohort differences, i.e. a comparison of individuals of the same age at different points in time and thus an examination of social change. Moreover, it allows longitudinal analyses, i.e. the comparison of information at certain points in time and hence a study of individual developments over time. The DEAS makes possible a comprehensive description of life situations and life contexts of the German population aged over 40 in the year 2014 (current cross-sectional analysis), an analysis of social changes over the points in time 1996, 2002, 2008 and 2014 and an investigation of intra-individual development over either six, twelve, fifteen, eighteen years, twenty-one or twenty-four years (1996-2002, 1996-2002-2008, 1996-2002-2008-2011, 1996-2002-2008-2011-2014 or 1996-2002-2008-2011-2014-2017-2020). Another perspective results from the comparison of individual development over a six-year period in the three time-frames 1996 to 2002, 2002 to 2008 or 2008 to 2014, i.e. a comparison between the development of two or three birth cohorts in a specific age segment.

== Findings ==
The findings of the German Ageing Survey are published in edited volumes, refereed journals and press informations. Press information is free of charge and available online at , where you will also find a list of selected DEAS publications in English. The Research Data Centre of the German Centre of Gerontology (FDZ-DZA) now also provides anonymised data sets for research purposes and advises researchers on its use.

== Literature ==
- Wettstein, M., Vogel, C., Nowossadeck, S., Spuling, S.M., & Tesch-Römer, C. (2020): Wie erleben Menschen in der zweiten Lebenshälfte die Corona-Krise? Wahrgenommene Bedrohung durch die Corona-Krise und subjektive Einflussmöglichkeiten auf eine mögliche Ansteckung mit dem Corona-Virus [DZA Aktuell 01/2020]. Berlin: Deutsches Zentrum für Altersfragen.
- Engstler, H., Romeu Gordo, L., & Simonson, J. (2020): Auswirkungen der Corona-Krise auf die Arbeitssituation von Menschen im mittleren und höheren Erwerbsalter. Ergebnisse des Deutschen Alterssurveys [DZA Aktuell 02/2020]. Berlin: Deutsches Zentrum für Altersfragen.
- Klaus, D., & Ehrlich, U. (2021): Corona-Krise = Krise der Angehörigen-Pflege? Zur veränderten Situation und den Gesundheitsrisiken der informell Unterstützungs- und Pflegeleistenden in Zeiten der Pandemie [DZA Aktuell 01/2021]. Berlin: Deutsches Zentrum für Altersfragen.
- Romeu Gordo, L, Engstler, H., Vogel, C., Simonson, J., & Lozano Alcántara, A. (2021): Welche Veränderungen ihrer finanziellen Situation berichten Menschen in der zweiten Lebenshälfte nach der ersten Welle der Corona-Pandemie? Ergebnisse des Deutschen Alterssurveys [DZA Aktuell 02/2021]. Berlin: Deutsches Zentrum für Altersfragen.
- Nowossadeck, S., Wettstein, M., & Cengia, A. (2021): Körperliche Aktivität in der Corona-Pandemie: Veränderung der Häufigkeit von Sport und Spazierengehen bei Menschen in der zweiten Lebenshälfte Einsamkeit steigt in der Corona-Pandemie bei Menschen im mittleren und hohen Erwachsenenalter gleichermaßen deutlich [DZA Aktuell 03/2021]. Berlin: Deutsches Zentrum für Altersfragen.
- Huxhold, O., & Tesch-Römer, C. (2021): Einsamkeit steigt in der Corona-Pandemie bei Menschen im mittleren und hohen Erwachsenenalter gleichermaßen deutlich [DZA Aktuell 04/2021]. Berlin: Deutsches Zentrum für Altersfragen.
- Kortmann, L., Hagen, C., Endter, C., Riesch, J., & Tesch-Römer, C. (2021): Internetnutzung von Menschen in der zweiten Lebenshälfte während der Corona-Pandemie: Soziale Ungleichheiten bleiben bestehe n [DZA Aktuell 05/2021]. Berlin: Deutsches Zentrum für Altersfragen.
- Wettstein, M, & Nowossadeck, S. (2021): Altersdiskriminierung in der Pandemie ist nicht die Regel – Jede zwanzigste Person in der zweiten Lebenshälfte berichtet erfahrene Benachteiligung wegen ihres Alters [DZA Aktuell 06/2021]. Berlin: Deutsches Zentrum für Altersfragen.
- C. Vogel, M. Wettstein, C. Tesch-Römer (Hrsg.): Frauen und Männer in der zweiten Lebenshälfte - Älterwerden im sozialen Wandel. Springer VS, Wiesbaden 2019, ISBN 978-3-658-25078-2 doi:10.1007/978-3-658-25079-9
- Mahne, K., Wolff, J.K., Simonson, J., & Tesch-Römer, C. (ed.) (2017): Altern im Wandel. Zwei Jahrzehnte Deutscher Alterssurvey (DEAS). Wiesbaden: Springer VS. doi:10.1007/978-3-658-12502-8
- Motel-Klingebiel, A., Wurm, S., & Tesch-Römer, C. (ed.) (2010): Altern im Wandel. Befunde des Deutschen Alterssurveys (DEAS). Stuttgart: Kohlhammer.
- Tesch-Römer, C., Engstler, H., & Wurm, S. (ed.) (2006): Altwerden in Deutschland. Sozialer Wandel und individuelle Entwicklung in der zweiten Lebenshälfte. Wiesbaden: VS Verlag für Sozialwissenschaften.
- Kohli, M. & Künemund, H. (ed.) (2005): Die zweite Lebenshälfte. Gesellschaftliche Lage und Partizipation im Spiegel des Alters-Survey (2nd expanded edition). Wiesbaden: VS-Verlag für Sozialwissenschaften.
