= National Register of Historic Places listings in Lancaster County, Nebraska =

Location of Lancaster County in Nebraska

Lancaster County, Nebraska, United States, has 110 properties and districts listed on the National Register of Historic Places, including two National Historic Landmarks. Another six properties were once listed but have been removed.

The locations of National Register properties and districts for which the latitude and longitude coordinates are included below may be seen in a map.

This National Park Service list is complete through NPS recent listings posted October 30, 2026.

== Current listings ==
	Name on the Register	Image	Date listed	Location	City or town	Description
1	Agricultural Hall	Agricultural Hall	December 10, 2010 (#10001001)	Lincoln's State Fairgrounds; 40°49′53″N 96°41′34″W	Lincoln	
2	Antelope Grocery	Antelope Grocery	March 17, 1988 (#88000213)	2406 J St. 40°48′30″N 96°41′10″W	Lincoln	
3	Barr Terrace	Barr Terrace	October 1, 1979 (#79003688)	627-643 S. 11th, and 1044 H St. 40°48′26″N 96°42′21″W	Lincoln	Part of the Nineteenth Century Terrace Houses Thematic Resource (TR)
4	Beatrice Creamery Company Lincoln Plant	Beatrice Creamery Company Lincoln Plant	March 12, 2012 (#12000104)	726 L St. 40°48′39″N 96°42′39″W	Lincoln	
5	James A. Beattie House	James A. Beattie House	December 4, 1990 (#90001773)	6706 Colby St. 40°50′00″N 96°37′43″W	Lincoln	
6	Jasper Newton Bell House	Jasper Newton Bell House	June 21, 1984 (#84002483)	2212 Sheldon St. 40°49′38″N 96°41′22″W	Lincoln	
7	Boulevards Historic District	Boulevards Historic District	December 10, 2008 (#08001180)	Roughly bounded by South St., Calvert and High Sts., S. 22nd and S. 24th Sts., Rock Island Trail, and Sheridan Boulevard; 40°47′04″N 96°41′05″W	Lincoln	
8	Guy A. Brown House	Guy A. Brown House	March 5, 1998 (#98000195)	219-221 S. 27th St. 40°48′42″N 96°40′58″W	Lincoln	
9	Brownbilt Residential Historic District	Brownbilt Residential Historic District	August 29, 2012 (#12000565)	Bounded by A, D, S. 37th to S. 40th Sts. 40°48′03″N 96°39′56″W	Lincoln	
10	Burckhardt House	Burckhardt House	June 25, 1999 (#99000746)	1236 Washington St. 40°47′54″N 96°42′11″W	Lincoln	Part of the African American Historic and Architectural Resources in Lincoln, Nebraska MPS
11	Edgar A. Burnett House	Edgar A. Burnett House	July 12, 2006 (#06000609)	3256 Holdrege St. 40°49′42″N 96°40′28″W	Lincoln	
12	Burr Block	Burr Block	May 18, 1979 (#79001448)	1206 O St. 40°48′50″N 96°42′14″W	Lincoln	
13	James D. Calhoun House	James D. Calhoun House	April 26, 2002 (#02000411)	1130 Plum St. 40°47′34″N 96°42′17″W	Lincoln	
14	William H. Charlton House	William H. Charlton House	January 25, 1997 (#96001614)	17705 S. 12th Street; 40°38′13″N 96°42′22″W	Roca	
15	Chicago, Burlington & Quincy Steam Locomotive No. 710	Chicago, Burlington & Quincy Steam Locomotive No. 710	June 20, 1997 (#97000609)	Near the junction of 7th and Q Sts. 40°48′57″N 96°42′42″W	Lincoln	
16	Christian Record Building	Christian Record Building	December 1, 1986 (#86003384)	3705 S. 48th St. 40°46′33″N 96°39′16″W	Lincoln	
17	City Hall	City Hall	October 15, 1969 (#69000132)	920 O St. 40°48′50″N 96°42′28″W	Lincoln	
18	College View Public Library	College View Public Library	June 28, 1984 (#84002486)	3800 S. 48th St. 40°46′23″N 96°39′13″W	Lincoln	
19	Eastridge Historic District	Eastridge Historic District	July 31, 2017 (#100001394)	Generally bounded by L to A Sts., 56th & Cotner Blvd. to Sunrise & Mulder Drs. 40°48′19″N 96°38′24″W	Lincoln	478 contributing buildings.
20	Eddy-Taylor House	Eddy-Taylor House	July 21, 1983 (#83001098)	435 N. 25th 40°49′03″N 96°41′08″W	Lincoln	
21	Fairview	Fairview	October 15, 1966 (#66000947)	4900 Sumner St. 40°47′45″N 96°39′06″W	Lincoln	
22	Federal Trust Building	Federal Trust Building	April 25, 2002 (#02000409)	134 S. 13th St. 40°48′46″N 96°42′08″W	Lincoln	
23	Genevieve Felthauser House		July 23, 2026 (#100013278)	1740 High Street; 40°46′52″N 96°41′45″W	Lincoln	
24	William H. Ferguson House	William H. Ferguson House	November 29, 1972 (#72000755)	700 S. 16th St. 40°48′24″N 96°41′52″W	Lincoln	
25	First National Bank Building	First National Bank Building	March 5, 1998 (#98000190)	1001 O St. 40°48′48″N 96°42′24″W	Lincoln	
26	First State Bank of Bethany	First State Bank of Bethany	July 24, 1986 (#86001936)	1551 N. Cotner Boulevard; 40°49′44″N 96°37′50″W	Lincoln	
27	First United Methodist Church Lincoln	First United Methodist Church Lincoln	June 24, 2024 (#100010464)	2720 N 50th St. 40°50′23″N 96°39′04″W	Lincoln	
28	Frank E. and Emma A. Gillen House	Frank E. and Emma A. Gillen House	March 5, 1998 (#98000188)	2245 A St. 40°47′55″N 96°41′17″W	Lincoln	
29	Gold and Company Store Building	Gold and Company Store Building	October 19, 1982 (#82000609)	1033 O St. 40°48′48″N 96°42′21″W	Lincoln	
30	Government Square	Government Square	April 15, 2004 (#04000303)	N. 9th to N. 10th St., O to P Sts. 40°48′51″N 96°42′28″W	Lincoln	
31	Greek Row Historic District	Greek Row Historic District	June 25, 1997 (#97000611)	Roughly, R St. from 14th to 17th Sts. and 16th St. from R toVine Sts. 40°49′06″N 96°41′55″W	Lincoln	
32	Harris House	Harris House	September 2, 1982 (#82003194)	1630 K St. 40°48′34″N 96°41′51″W	Lincoln	
33	Hayward School	Hayward School	August 23, 1985 (#85001795)	1215 N. 9th 40°49′34″N 96°42′31″W	Lincoln	
34	Helmer-Winnett-White Flats	Helmer-Winnett-White Flats	October 1, 1979 (#79003690)	1022-1028 K St. 40°48′34″N 96°42′22″W	Lincoln	Part of the Nineteenth Century Terrace Houses TR
35	Herter Farmstead	Herter Farmstead	July 24, 2000 (#00000835)	4949 S. 148th 40°45′51″N 96°31′16″W	Walton	
36	W.F. Hitchcock House	W.F. Hitchcock House	December 5, 2002 (#02001482)	2733 Sheridan Boulevard; 40°47′11″N 96°40′54″W	Lincoln	Colonial Revival-styled house built in 1922
37	Hotel Capital	Hotel Capital	December 5, 1983 (#83003994)	139 N. 11th St. 40°48′52″N 96°42′21″W	Lincoln	
38	Aeneas Yates-Charles Hurlbut House	Aeneas Yates-Charles Hurlbut House	September 17, 1999 (#99001167)	720 S. 16th St. 40°48′22″N 96°41′52″W	Lincoln	Now occupied by Alpha Delta Pi sorority
39	Iowa-Nebraska Light and Power Company Plant	Iowa-Nebraska Light and Power Company Plant	March 6, 2023 (#100008676)	440 South 8th St. 40°48′34″N 96°42′36″W	Lincoln	
40	Thomas P. Kennard House	Thomas P. Kennard House	April 16, 1969 (#69000134)	1627 H St. 40°48′24″N 96°41′51″W	Lincoln	
41	Theodore A. Kiesselbach House	Theodore A. Kiesselbach House	July 1, 1994 (#94000651)	3232 Holdrege St. 40°49′42″N 96°40′30″W	Lincoln	
42	Rose Kirkwood Brothel	Rose Kirkwood Brothel	August 28, 2012 (#12000566)	124 S. 9th St. 40°48′47″N 96°42′29″W	Lincoln	
43	Amel H. Koop House	Amel H. Koop House	December 2, 2014 (#14001014)	1401 S. 15th St. 40°47′56″N 96°42′00″W	Lincoln	
44	Lancaster Block	Lancaster Block	April 12, 1989 (#89000245)	6201-6205 Havelock Ave. 40°51′25″N 96°38′08″W	Lincoln	
45	Lewis-Syford House	Lewis-Syford House	February 18, 1971 (#71000486)	700 N. 16th St. 40°49′13″N 96°41′52″W	Lincoln	
46	Lincoln Army Air Field Regimental Chapel	Lincoln Army Air Field Regimental Chapel	June 17, 1993 (#93000535)	4601 NW. 48th St. 40°51′38″N 96°47′15″W	Lincoln	
47	Lincoln Haymarket Historic District	Lincoln Haymarket Historic District	July 8, 2014 (#14000288)	Generally 7th to 9th & N to R Sts. 40°48′53″N 96°42′36″W	Lincoln	(Develop this topic within Haymarket District (Lincoln, Nebraska)). Two buildings demolished in 2023. 700 and 720 O St.
48	Lincoln Liberty Life Insurance Building	Lincoln Liberty Life Insurance Building	January 19, 1988 (#87002299)	113 N. 11th St. 40°48′50″N 96°42′21″W	Lincoln	
49	Lincoln Veterans Administration Hospital Historic District	Lincoln Veterans Administration Hospital Historic District	September 10, 2012 (#12000785)	600 S. 70th St. 40°48′32″N 96°37′21″W	Lincoln	Part of the United States Second Generation Veterans Hospitals MPS
50	Lincoln YWCA Building	Lincoln YWCA Building	June 21, 1984 (#84002490)	1432 N St. 40°48′46″N 96°42′01″W	Lincoln	
51	Lyman Terrace	Lyman Terrace	October 1, 1979 (#79003689)	1111-1119 H St. 40°48′24″N 96°42′18″W	Lincoln	Part of the Nineteenth Century Terrace Houses TR
52	Masonic Temple	Masonic Temple	August 5, 2005 (#05000792)	1635 L St. 40°48′36″N 96°41′50″W	Lincoln	
53	McWilliams House	McWilliams House	June 25, 1999 (#99000748)	1723 N. 29th St. 40°49′49″N 96°40′48″W	Lincoln	Part of the African American Historic and Architectural Resources in Lincoln, Nebraska MPS
54	Mount Emerald and Capitol Additions Historic Residential District	Mount Emerald and Capitol Additions Historic Residential District	June 5, 1980 (#80002453)	Roughly bounded by A, G, 17th, and 22nd Sts. 40°48′08″N 96°41′34″W	Lincoln	
55	Municipal Lighting and Waterworks Plant	Municipal Lighting and Waterworks Plant	July 24, 1986 (#86001938)	2901 A St. 40°47′55″N 96°40′41″W	Lincoln	
56	William L. and Sydney V. Murphy House	William L. and Sydney V. Murphy House	November 4, 1994 (#94001280)	2525 N St. 40°48′44″N 96°41′04″W	Lincoln	
57	Nebraska City to Fort Kearny Cutoff Ruts at Spring Creek Prairie	Nebraska City to Fort Kearny Cutoff Ruts at Spring Creek Prairie	July 11, 2002 (#02000771)	11700 SW. 100th St. 40°41′30″N 96°50′54″W	Denton	
58	Nebraska Governor's Mansion	Nebraska Governor's Mansion	March 12, 2008 (#08000173)	1425 H St. 40°48′23″N 96°42′02″W	Lincoln	
59	Nebraska State Capitol	Nebraska State Capitol	October 16, 1970 (#70000372)	1445 K St. 40°48′29″N 96°41′57″W	Lincoln	
60	Nebraska State Historical Society Building	Nebraska State Historical Society Building	August 21, 2003 (#03000797)	1500 R St. 40°49′02″N 96°41′59″W	Lincoln	
61	Nebraska Telephone Company Building	Nebraska Telephone Company Building	November 16, 1978 (#78001703)	128-130 S. 13th St. 40°48′47″N 96°42′09″W	Lincoln	
62	Nine-Mile Prairie	Nine-Mile Prairie	July 30, 1986 (#86002089)	Northwest of Huskerville; 40°52′01″N 96°48′54″W	Lincoln	
63	Old Main, Nebraska Wesleyan University	Old Main, Nebraska Wesleyan University	May 21, 1975 (#75001097)	50th and St. Paul Sts. 40°50′20″N 96°38′58″W	Lincoln	
64	Old University Library	Old University Library	August 6, 1975 (#75001098)	11th and R Sts. 40°49′02″N 96°42′22″W	Lincoln	
65	Palisade and Regent Apartments	Palisade and Regent Apartments	March 5, 1998 (#98000191)	1035 S. 17th St. and 1626 D St. 40°48′10″N 96°41′50″W	Lincoln	
66	Park Hill	Park Hill	September 3, 2010 (#10000628)	1913 S. 41st St. 40°47′35″N 96°39′46″W	Lincoln	
67	Park Manor Residential Historic District	Park Manor Residential Historic District	September 4, 2013 (#13000675)	Bounded by A, South, 56th & 70th Sts. 40°47′44″N 96°38′04″W	Lincoln	
68	Peter Peterson Farmstead	Peter Peterson Farmstead	February 11, 1980 (#80002456)	Address Restricted	Waverly	
69	Phi Delta Theta Fraternity House	Phi Delta Theta Fraternity House	May 28, 1986 (#86001183)	1545 R St. 40°49′00″N 96°41′55″W	Lincoln	
70	Phi Kappa Tau Fraternity House	Phi Kappa Tau Fraternity House	November 25, 2005 (#05001329)	5305 Huntington Ave. 40°50′13″N 96°38′48″W	Lincoln	
71	R.O. Phillips House	R.O. Phillips House	November 29, 1979 (#79001449)	1845 D St; 40°48′08″N 96°41′40″W	Lincoln	
72	Pioneers Park	Pioneers Park	June 17, 1993 (#93000538)	Junction of W. Van Dorn and Coddington Sts. 40°46′39″N 96°45′57″W	Lincoln	
73	President and Ambassador Apartments	President and Ambassador Apartments	December 10, 1993 (#93001401)	1330 and 1340 Lincoln Mall; 40°48′30″N 96°42′06″W	Lincoln	
74	Quinn Chapel African Methodist Episcopal Church and Parsonage	Quinn Chapel African Methodist Episcopal Church and Parsonage	June 25, 1999 (#99000749)	1225 S. 9th St. 40°48′04″N 96°42′32″W	Lincoln	Part of the African American Historic and Architectural Resources in Lincoln, Nebraska MPS
75	Retzlaff Farmstead	Retzlaff Farmstead	May 31, 1979 (#79001450)	Address Restricted	Lincoln	
76	Robbers' Cave	Robbers' Cave	March 13, 2020 (#100005055)	925 Robbers Cave Rd. 40°46′49″N 96°42′27″W	Lincoln	
77	Rock Island Depot	Rock Island Depot	September 3, 1971 (#71000487)	1944 O St. 40°48′51″N 96°41′34″W	Lincoln	
78	Nimrod Ross House	Nimrod Ross House	June 25, 1999 (#99000747)	445 S. 30th St. 40°48′28″N 96°40′37″W	Lincoln	Part of the African American Historic and Architectural Resources in Lincoln, Nebraska MPS
79	Royer-Williams House	Royer-Williams House	June 14, 1982 (#82003195)	407 N. 26th St. 40°49′02″N 96°41′02″W	Lincoln	Grace, Sarah, Leslie and Katie's little castle since July 29th, 2023
80	Ryons-Alexander House	Ryons-Alexander House	July 8, 1982 (#82003196)	1835 Ryons St. 40°47′26″N 96°41′41″W	Lincoln	
81	St. Charles Apartments	St. Charles Apartments	September 12, 1985 (#85002138)	4717 Baldwin Ave. 40°50′17″N 96°39′17″W	Lincoln	
82	Schrader Archeological Site		January 21, 1974 (#74002290)	9 miles (14 km) south of Lincoln	Roca	Village along Salt Creek named for the landowner. Excavated by E.E. Blackman in 1901; by him denominated the "Roca Site"
83	Scottish Rite Temple	Scottish Rite Temple	December 1, 1986 (#86003359)	332 Centennial Mall, S. 40°48′38″N 96°41′58″W	Lincoln	
84	Sheldon Memorial Art Gallery	Sheldon Memorial Art Gallery	September 3, 2013 (#13000676)	12th & R Sts., University of Nebraska–Lincoln; 40°49′03″N 96°42′16″W	Lincoln	
85	Sky Park Manor	Sky Park Manor	August 8, 2016 (#16000515)	1301 Lincoln Mall; 40°48′29″N 96°42′08″W	Lincoln	
86	South Bottoms Historic District	South Bottoms Historic District	July 17, 1986 (#86001717)	Roughly bounded by M and J and H and G Sts., 2nd and 9th Sts., and W. B Sts., and Salt Creek; 40°48′16″N 96°43′02″W	Lincoln	
87	Frank M. Spalding House	Frank M. Spalding House	March 25, 1999 (#99000386)	2221 Sheridan Boulevard; 40°47′25″N 96°41′07″W	Lincoln	
88	Speidel Barn	Speidel Barn	June 26, 2023 (#100009090)	7800 South 40th St. 40°43′57″N 96°39′48″W	Lincoln	
89	R.O. Stake House	R.O. Stake House	April 27, 2005 (#05000357)	145 S. 28th St. 40°48′45″N 96°40′53″W	Lincoln	
90	State Arsenal	State Arsenal	September 17, 1981 (#81000372)	17th and Court Sts. 40°49′45″N 96°41′49″W	Lincoln	
91	Strode Building	Strode Building	November 9, 2020 (#100005770)	1600-1608 O St. 40°48′49″N 96°41′52″W	Lincoln	
92	Stuart Building	Stuart Building	December 23, 2003 (#03001341)	13th and P Sts. 40°48′52″N 96°42′08″W	Lincoln	
93	Temple of Congregation B'nai Jeshurun	Temple of Congregation B'nai Jeshurun	June 25, 1982 (#82003197)	2061 S. 20th Street; 40°47′31″N 96°41′32″W	Lincoln	
94	Terminal Building	Terminal Building	December 29, 1986 (#86003527)	947 O St. 40°48′48″N 96°42′26″W	Lincoln	
95	John M. Thayer House	John M. Thayer House	December 5, 2002 (#02001479)	1901 Prospect St. 40°47′41″N 96°41′38″W	Lincoln	
96	Tifereth Israel Synagogue	Tifereth Israel Synagogue	May 9, 1985 (#85000958)	344 S. 18th St. 40°48′38″N 96°41′42″W	Lincoln	Now Tifereth Place Apts.
97	William H. Tyler House	William H. Tyler House	April 6, 1978 (#78001704)	808 D St. 40°48′10″N 96°42′35″W	Lincoln	
98	University Place Historic Residential District	University Place Historic Residential District	February 7, 2003 (#03000069)	Roughly Walker Ave., 51st-54th Sts., Leighton Ave., and 49th-53rd Sts. 40°50′09″N 96°39′06″W	Lincoln	
99	Veith Building	Veith Building	September 18, 1980 (#80002454)	816 P St. 40°48′54″N 96°42′34″W	Lincoln	
100	War and Victory	War and Victory	August 14, 2024 (#100010716)	3200 Veterans Memorial Drive; 40°47′48″N 96°40′36″W	Lincoln	
101	Albert Watkins House	Albert Watkins House	April 3, 1989 (#89000244)	920 D St. 40°48′10″N 96°42′28″W	Lincoln	
102	Wesleyan Hospital and Nurses Training School	Wesleyan Hospital and Nurses Training School	November 12, 2015 (#15000794)	2742 N. 48th St. 40°50′25″N 96°39′12″W	Lincoln	
103	Whitehall	Whitehall	October 29, 1982 (#82000610)	5903 Walker; 40°50′10″N 96°38′24″W	Lincoln	
104	Woods Brothers Building	Woods Brothers Building	September 18, 1980 (#80002455)	132 S. 13th St. 40°48′46″N 96°42′09″W	Lincoln	
105	Frank and Nelle Cochrane Woods House	Frank and Nelle Cochrane Woods House	June 30, 1995 (#95000793)	2501 Sheridan Boulevard; 40°47′14″N 96°41′04″W	Lincoln	
106	Woodsshire Residential Historic District	Woodsshire Residential Historic District	March 29, 2011 (#11000147)	Bounded by High and Calvert Sts., South 17th to South 20th Sts. 40°46′45″N 96°41′41″W	Lincoln	
107	Wyuka Cemetery	Wyuka Cemetery	July 19, 1982 (#82003198)	3600 O St. 40°49′01″N 96°39′54″W	Lincoln	
108	Yates-Martin House	Yates-Martin House	August 10, 2022 (#100007939)	2109 South 24th St. 40°47′29″N 96°41′14″W	Lincoln	
109	John H. and Christina Yost House	John H. and Christina Yost House	April 26, 2002 (#02000410)	1900 S. 25th St. 40°47′36″N 96°41′08″W	Lincoln	
110	Arthur C. Ziemer House	Arthur C. Ziemer House	November 23, 1977 (#77000832)	2030 Euclid Ave. 40°47′40″N 96°41′28″W	Lincoln	

== Former listings ==
	Name on the Register	Image	Date listed	Date removed	Location	City or town	Description
1	Baldwin Terrace		October 1, 1979 (#79003687)	March 14, 2007	429–443 S. 12th St., and 1134–1142 K St.	Lincoln	Demolished in 1984.
2	Beal Slough Bridge	Beal Slough Bridge	June 29, 1992 (#92000744)	March 25, 2019	W. Pioneers Boulevard over Beal Slough, 0.5 miles (0.80 km) west of Lincoln; 40°46′13″N 96°42′46″W	Lincoln	Bridge no longer extant; replaced ca. 2004. Part of the Highway Bridges in Nebraska Multiple Property Submission (MPS).
3	Ehlers Round Barn	Ehlers Round Barn	June 30, 1995 (#95000799)	December 31, 2013	12200 S. 110th Street; 40°41′31″N 96°34′16″W	Roca	Destroyed in a 2012 snowstorm.
4	Metropolitan Apartments		January 19, 1988 (#87002298)	March 14, 2007	502 South Twelfth Street	Lincoln	Demolished in 2003.
5	Olive Branch Bridge	Olive Branch Bridge	June 29, 1992 (#92000739)	December 31, 2013	W. Stagecoach Rd. over Olive Brook, 1.7 miles (2.7 km) southwest of Sprague; 40°36′37″N 96°46′28″W	Sprague	Bridge no longer extant. Part of the Highway Bridges in Nebraska MPS.
6	Townsend Photography Studio		December 20, 1984 (#84000478)	March 14, 2007	226 South 11th Street	Lincoln	Demolished in 1997.

== See also ==
- List of National Historic Landmarks in Nebraska
- National Register of Historic Places listings in Nebraska
