= Ziemer =

Ziemer is a surname. Notable people with the surname include:

- Arthur C. Ziemer (1848–1913), American Christian Science healer
- Andrew Ziemer (born 1967), American soccer player
- Ernst Ziemer (1911–1986), German soldier
- Gregor Ziemer (1899–1982), American educator
- James L. Ziemer (born 1951), American businessman
- Marcel Ziemer (born 1985), German footballer
- R. Timothy Ziemer, American expert in disaster response and health threats
