= Lincoln Liberty Life Insurance Building =

- U.S. National Register of Historic Places
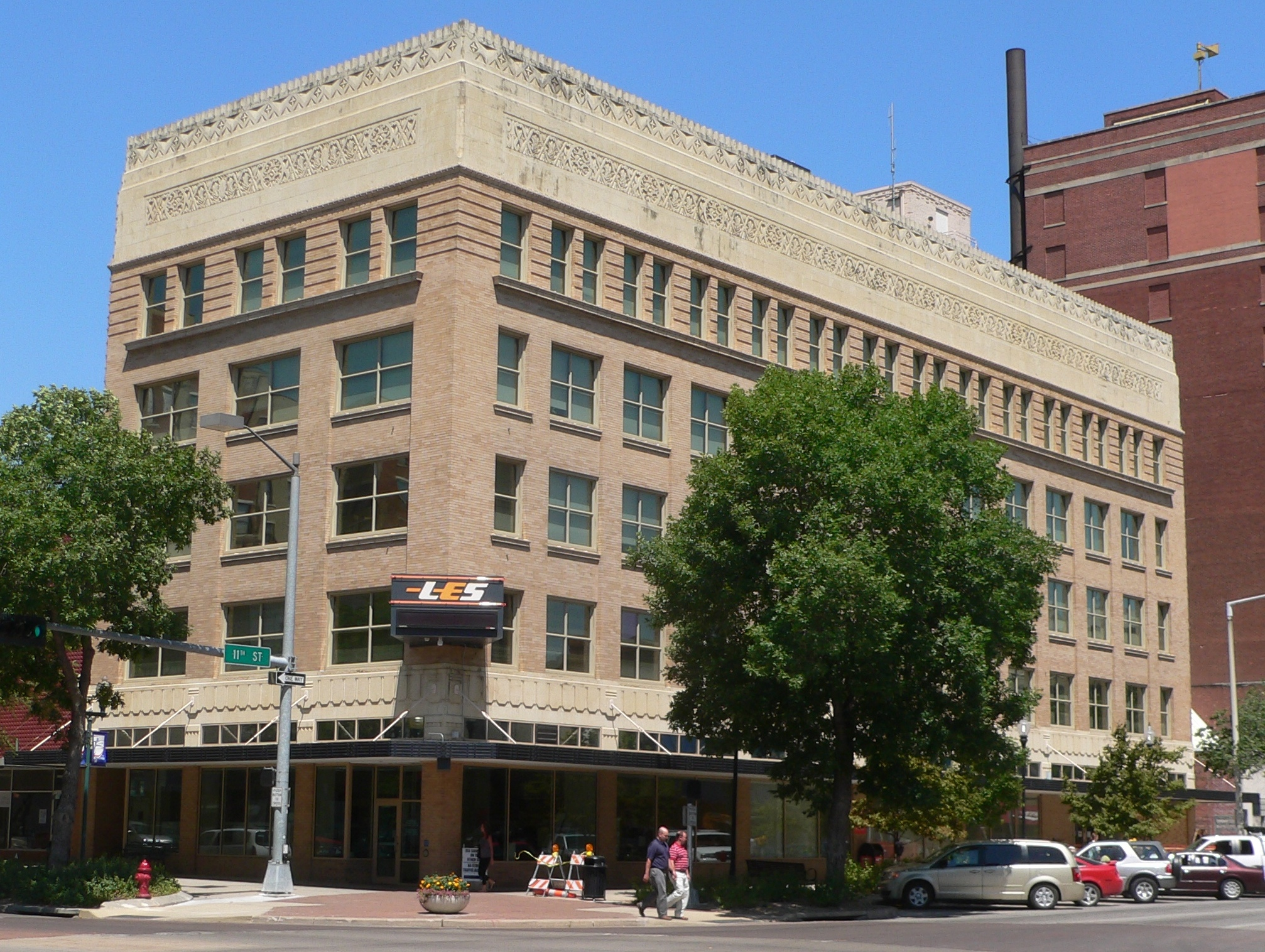
- The building in 2012

- Location within Nebraska Location within the United States
- Location: 113 North Eleventh Street, Lincoln, Nebraska
- Coordinates: 40°48′52″N 96°42′14″W
- Area: 0.2 acres (0.081 ha)
- Built: 1936
- Architect: Harry Meginnis; Edward G. Schaumberg
- Architectural style: Chicago, Art Deco, Commercial Style
- NRHP reference No.: 87002299
- Added to NRHP: January 19, 1988

The Lincoln Liberty Life Insurance Building is a historic building in Lincoln, Nebraska. It was built in 1906–07 as a five-story building designed in the Commercial style by Ferdinard C. Fiske and Charles A. Dieman, and originally known as the Little Building. It was redesigned in the Art Deco style by architects Harry Meginnis and Edward G. Schaumberg in 1936, and renamed the Lincoln Liberty Life Insurance Building to reflect its new owner. It has been listed on the National Register of Historic Places since January 19, 1988.
