= Eddy-Taylor House =

- U.S. National Register of Historic Places
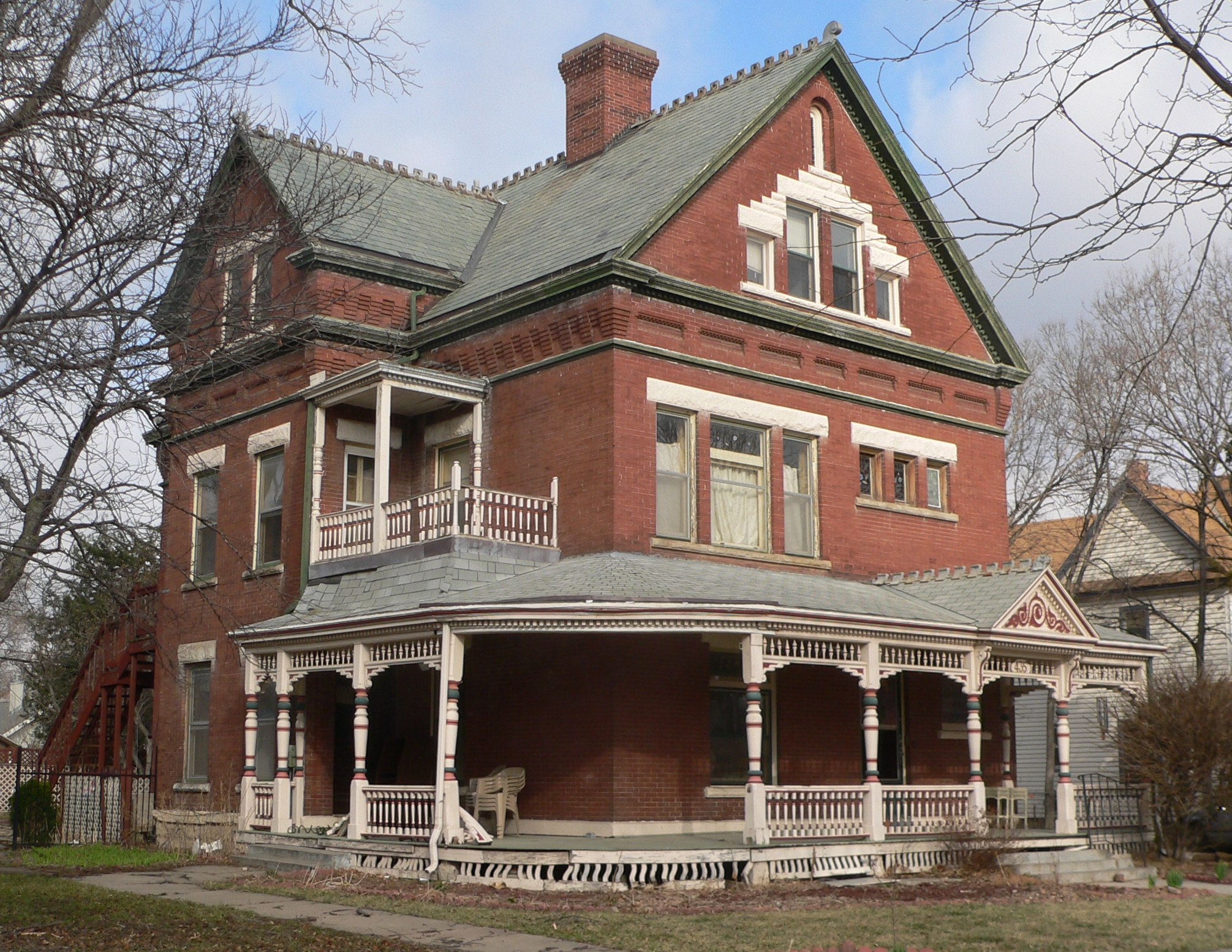
- The house in 2012

- Location within Nebraska Location within the United States
- Location: 435 North 25th, Lincoln, Nebraska
- Coordinates: 40°49′19″N 96°41′06″W
- Area: less than one acre
- Built: 1891
- Architectural style: Queen Anne
- NRHP reference No.: 83001098
- Added to NRHP: July 21, 1983

The Eddy-Taylor House is a historic house in Lincoln, Nebraska. It was built with bricks in 1891 for Ambrose Eddy, and designed in the Queen Anne style. In 1902, it was purchased by Professor W. G. L. Taylor, who was the chair of the department of Political Economy at the University of Nebraska–Lincoln from 1893 to 1911. The house has been listed on the National Register of Historic Places since July 21, 1983.
