= William H. Tyler House =

- U.S. National Register of Historic Places
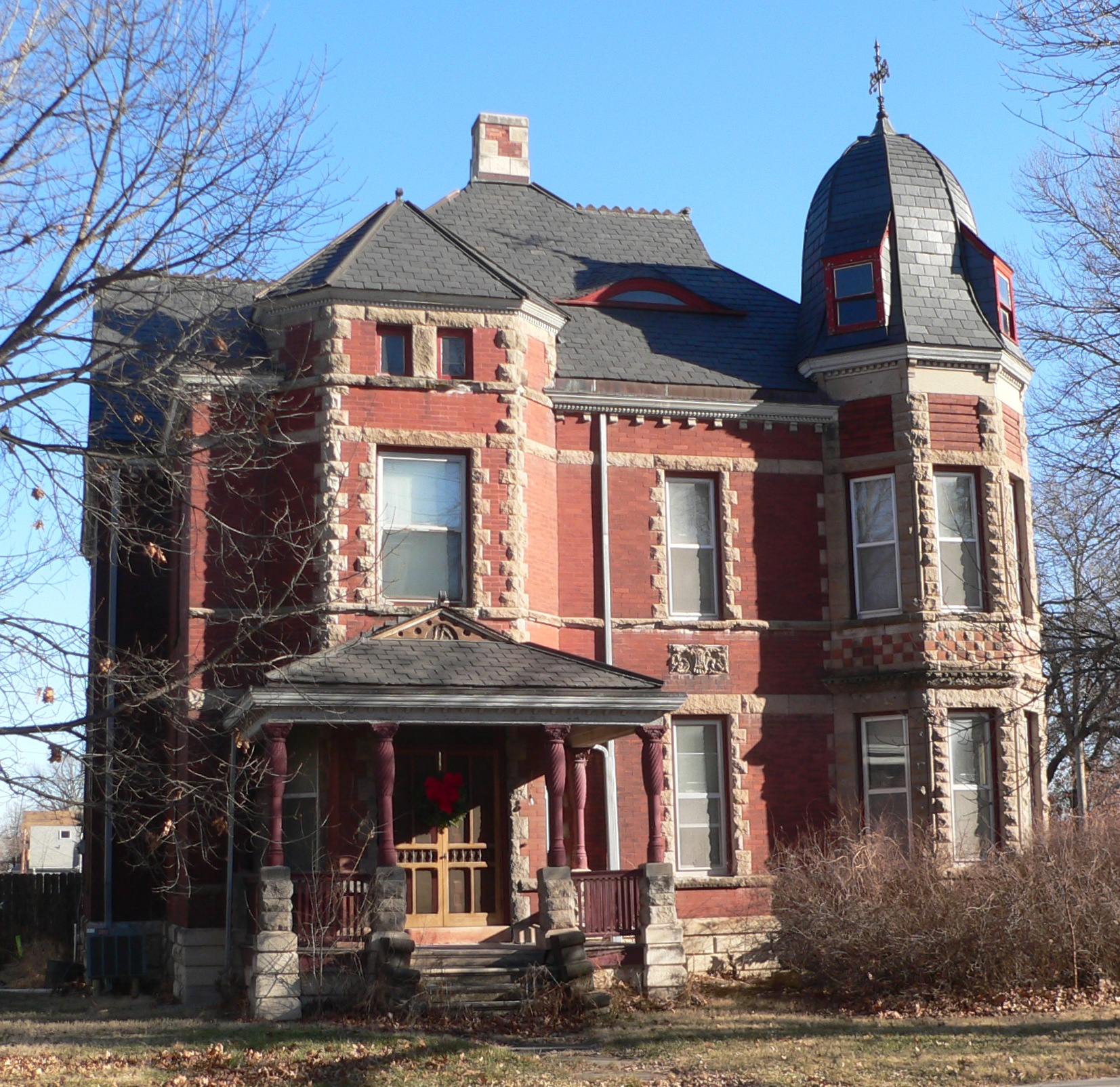
- The house in 2012

- Location within Nebraska Location within the United States
- Location: 808 D Street, Lincoln, Nebraska
- Coordinates: 40°48′10″N 96°42′35″W
- Area: less than one acre
- Built: 1890
- Architect: James Tyler
- Architectural style: Queen Anne, Richardsonian Romanesque
- NRHP reference No.: 78001704
- Added to NRHP: April 6, 1978

The William H. Tyler House is a historic house in Lincoln, Nebraska. It was built in 1890 for William Henry Tyler, an immigrant from Wales who founded the W. H. Tyler Stone Company in Lincoln in 1881. It was designed in the Queen Anne and Richardsonian Romanesque styles by James Tyler, William's brother. It has been listed on the National Register of Historic Places since April 6, 1978.
