= Veith Building =

- U.S. National Register of Historic Places
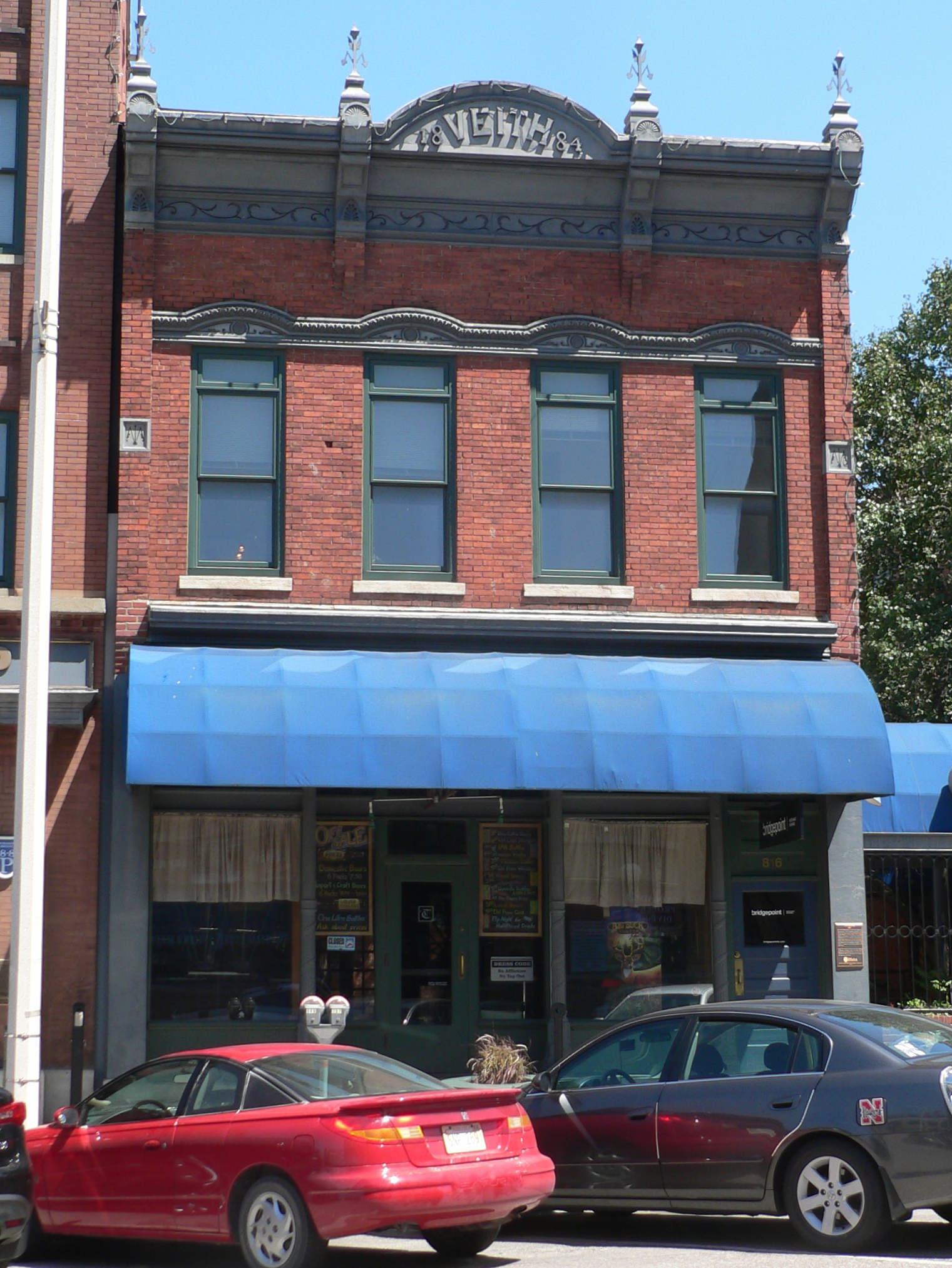
- The building in 2012

- Location within Nebraska Location within the United States
- Location: 816 P Street, Lincoln, Nebraska
- Coordinates: 40°48′54″N 96°42′32″W
- Area: less than one acre
- Built: 1884
- Architectural style: Victorian
- NRHP reference No.: 80002454
- Added to NRHP: September 18, 1980

The Veith Building is a historic two-story building in Lincoln, Nebraska. It was built in 1884, and designed in the Victorian style. It is "one of the oldest commercial buildings" in Lincoln.

In October 1980, plans were unveiled to convert the building into a European restaurant called Les Bonnes Femmes. However, by 1982 the building still hadn't been converted. There was a Turkish restaurant in 1984. In 1989, the top floor was turned into a dance studio.

The building has been listed on the National Register of Historic Places since September 18, 1980.
