= Albert Watkins House =

- U.S. National Register of Historic Places
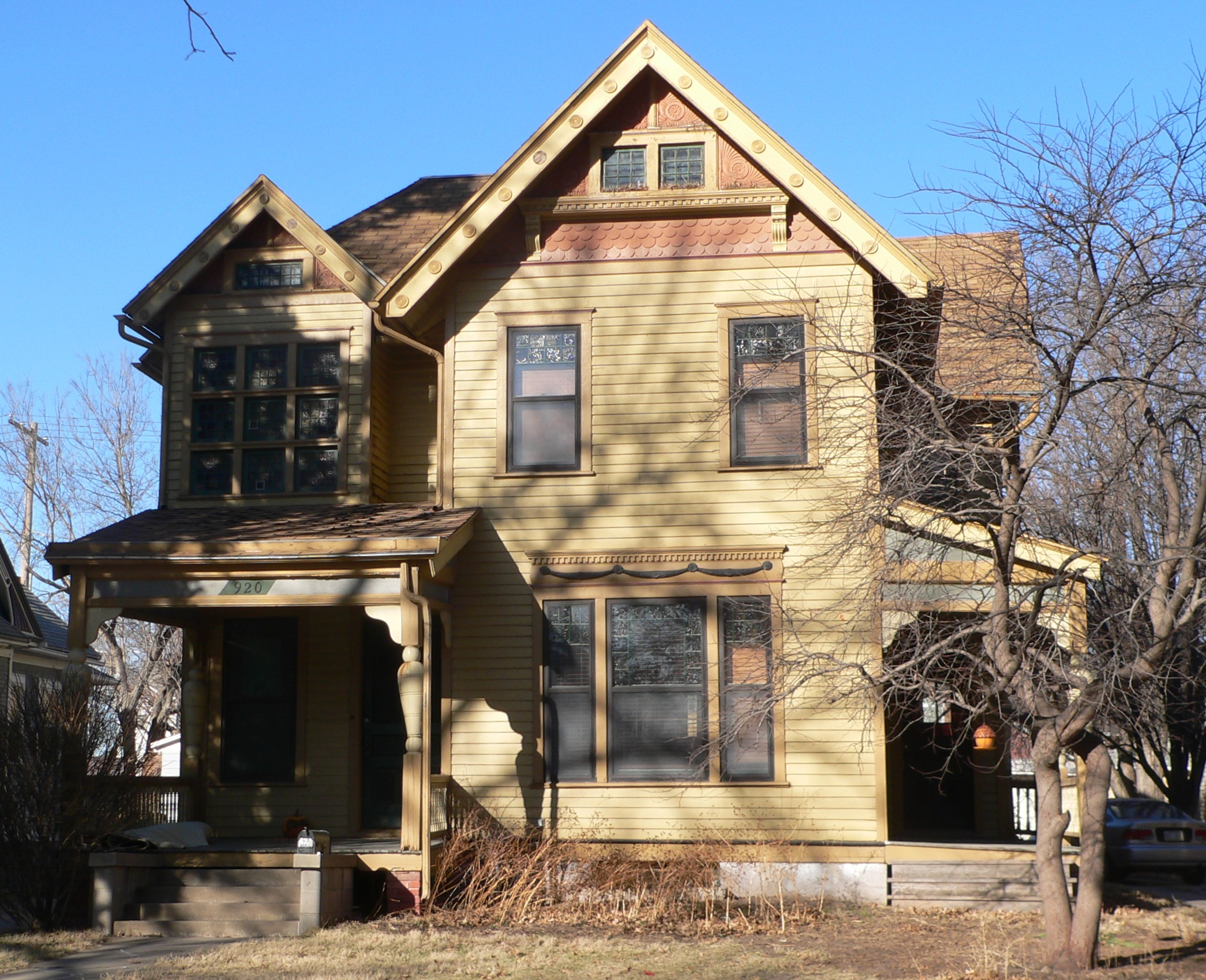
- The house in 2012

- Location within Nebraska Location within the United States
- Location: 920 D Street, Lincoln, Nebraska
- Coordinates: 40°48′07″N 96°42′38″W
- Area: 0.2 acres (0.081 ha)
- Built: 1902
- Architectural style: Queen Anne
- NRHP reference No.: 89000244
- Added to NRHP: April 3, 1989

The Albert Watkins House is a historic two-and-a-half-story house in Lincoln, Nebraska. It was built in 1902 for Albert Watkins, an immigrant from England who became a newspaper editor and historian. Watkins edited The Illustrated History of Nebraska in 1905, and he was the historian of the Nebraska State Historical Society from 1910 to 1923. The house was designed in the Queen Anne style. It has been listed on the National Register of Historic Places since April 3, 1989.

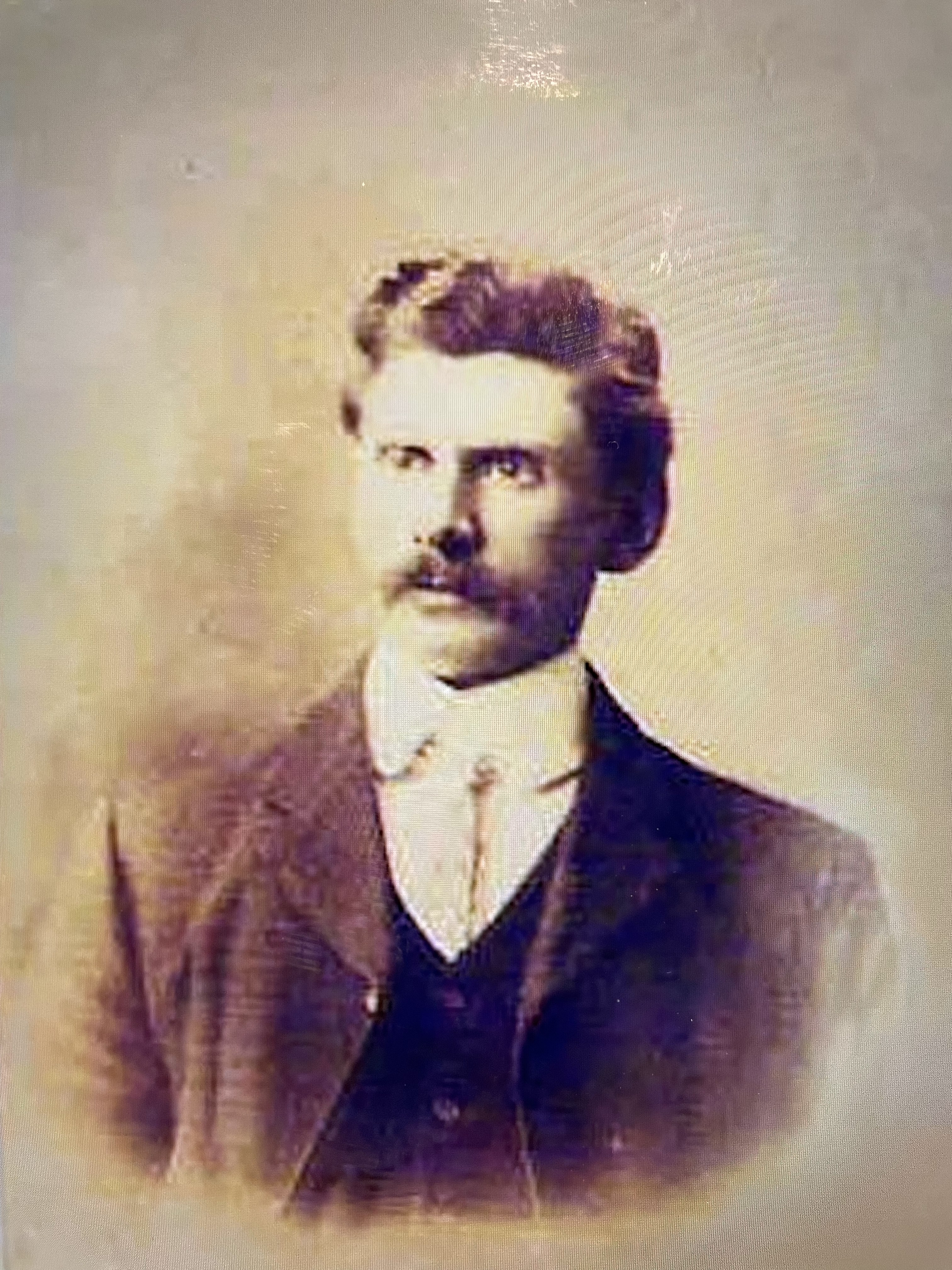
A photo of original house owner and historian Albert Watkins

In 2007, the house became the home of the Colonel Mustard Amateur Attic Theatre company, a local nonprofit that self-wrote, self-composed, and otherwise self-created multiple theatrical productions. The first production was a Christmas show that took place in the attic of the Watkins House. Following the success, the company grew in size and scope and went on to produce several locally beloved productions including: Robyn Wood, Jurassic Park the Musical, Gods of the Prairie, Snakes in the Attic, Spider-man the Musical (the musical), and more. The shows were attended by community members from tens to hundreds. Eventually, the productions garnered so much success that they had to move out of the house and onto the empty lot across the street.

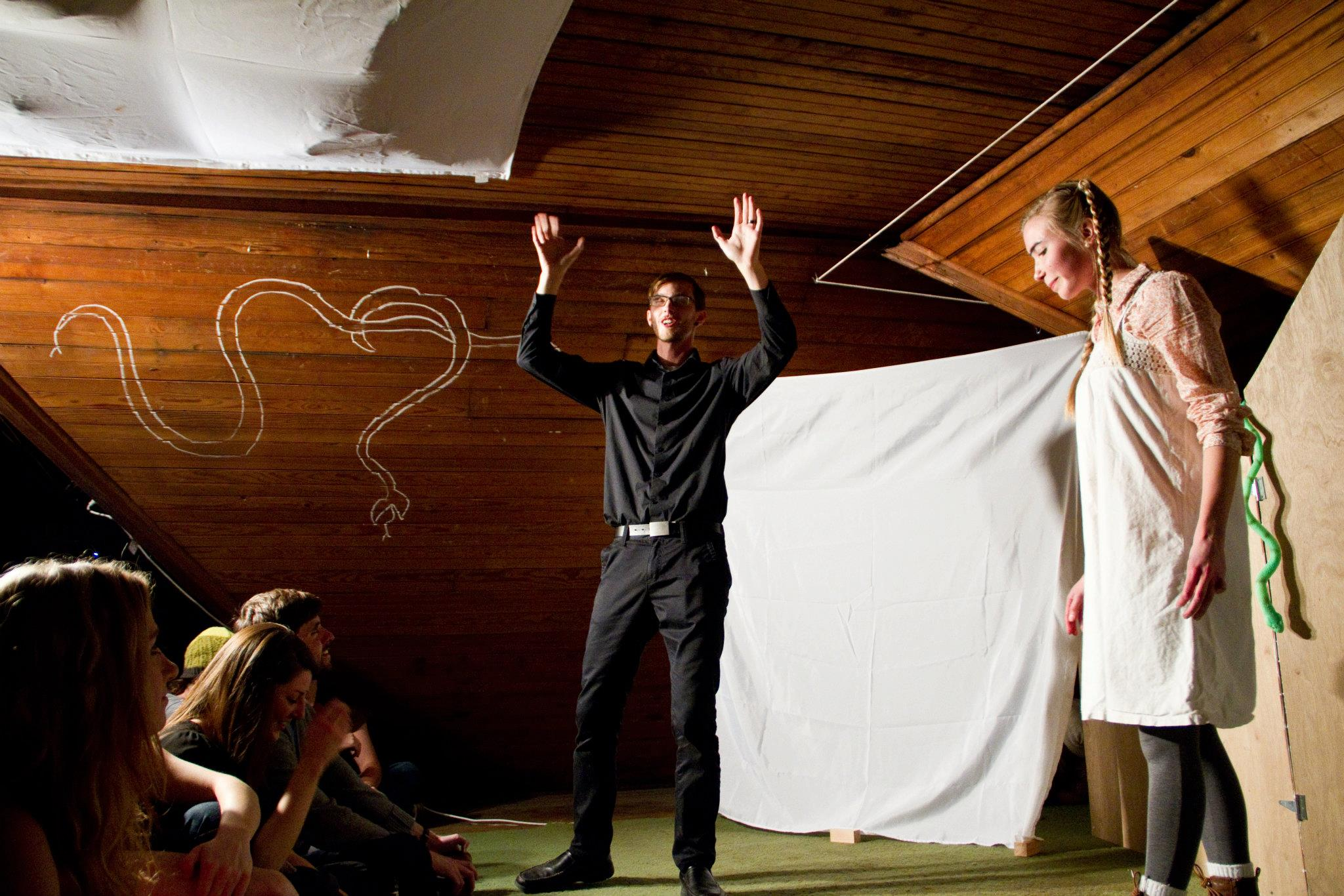
Photo from attic-production "Snakes in the Attic"

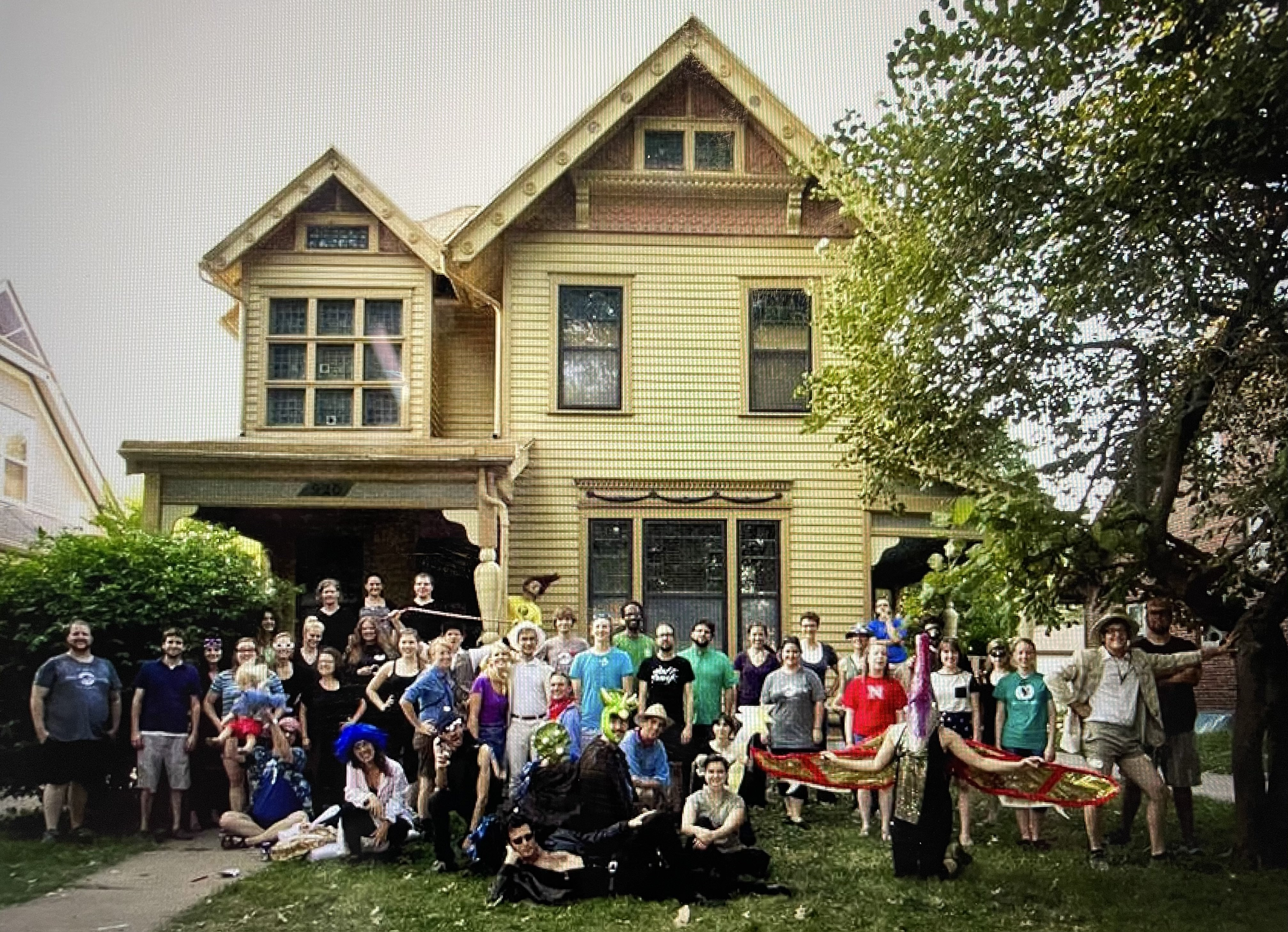
Cast of Spiderman the Musical, the Musical in front of the Albert Watkins House

In 2012, the Albert Watkins house became the home of Exposed Audio Studios which later went on to become Dylan Parker Productions. Exposed Audio studio, run by Producer Dylan Parker, went on to produce songs for notable local singer-songwriters such as: Nick Dahlquist, Harry Norman, Nick Jester, and several others.

As the era of local community shows began to wind down, the era of college-life began to take shape. For the next several years, the Albert Watkins House would become a revolving door for housing local students. The attic continued to be a popular location for small gatherings largely due to the large remainder of props and costumes from the theatre productions; making the location a costume party delight. The University of Nebraska-Lincoln cymbal line, also known as the Cymballas, hosted a holiday party there in 2013. The attic also became a central hub of Watkins family lore, as an etching of Albert Watkins' daughter can be found inscribed into the wood paneling still today. Many say that her soul remains in the attic, playing with the toys her friends have left behind.

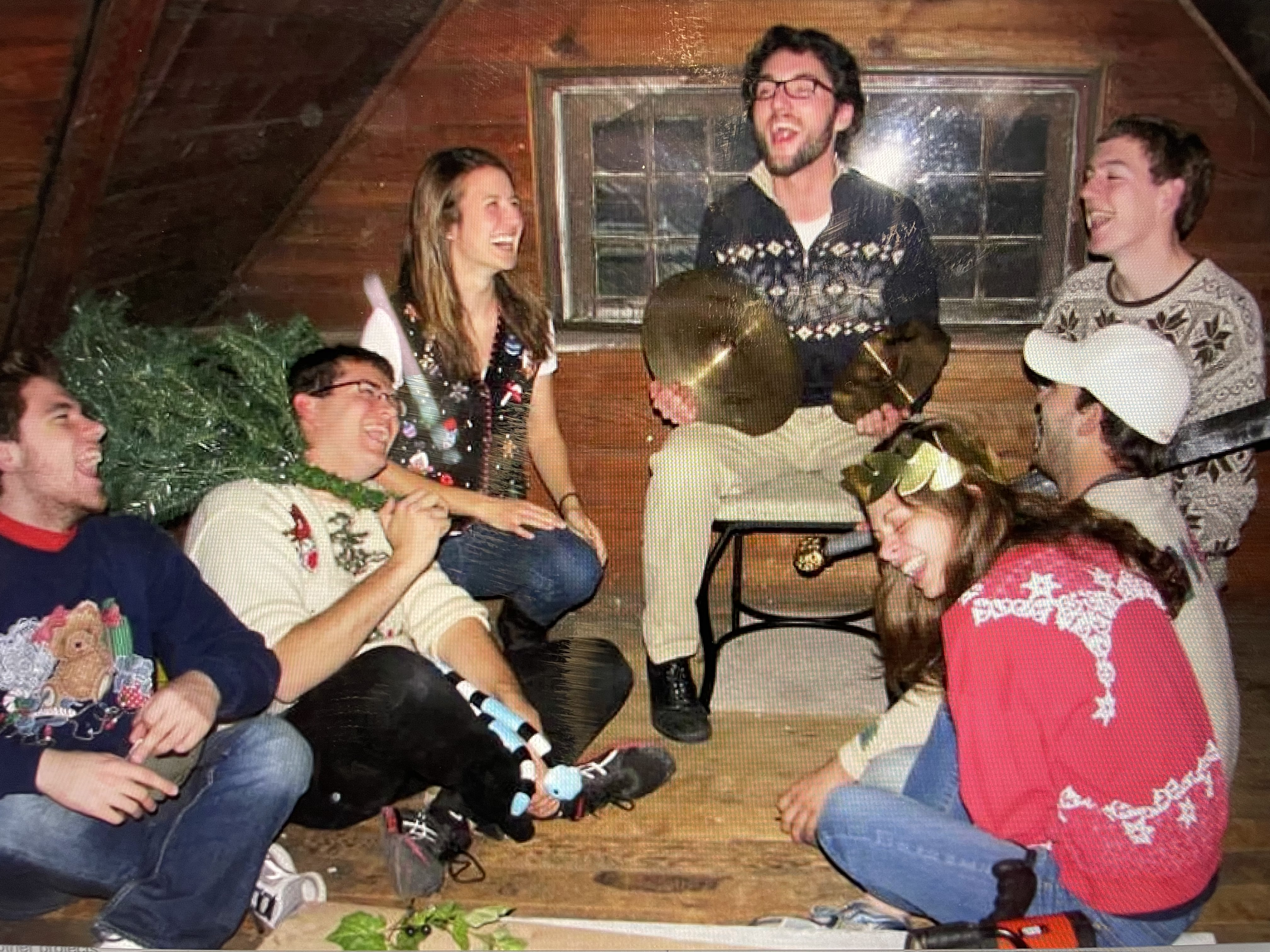
The University of Nebraska Lincoln cymbal players celebrating a holiday party in the attic.

While the attic saw many moments of holiday cheer, the Watkins House basement became a hub for the more raucous side of partying. Guests of these parties carried on the tradition that the theatre company had started, writing their names on the wall. The signature mural can still be seen to this day.

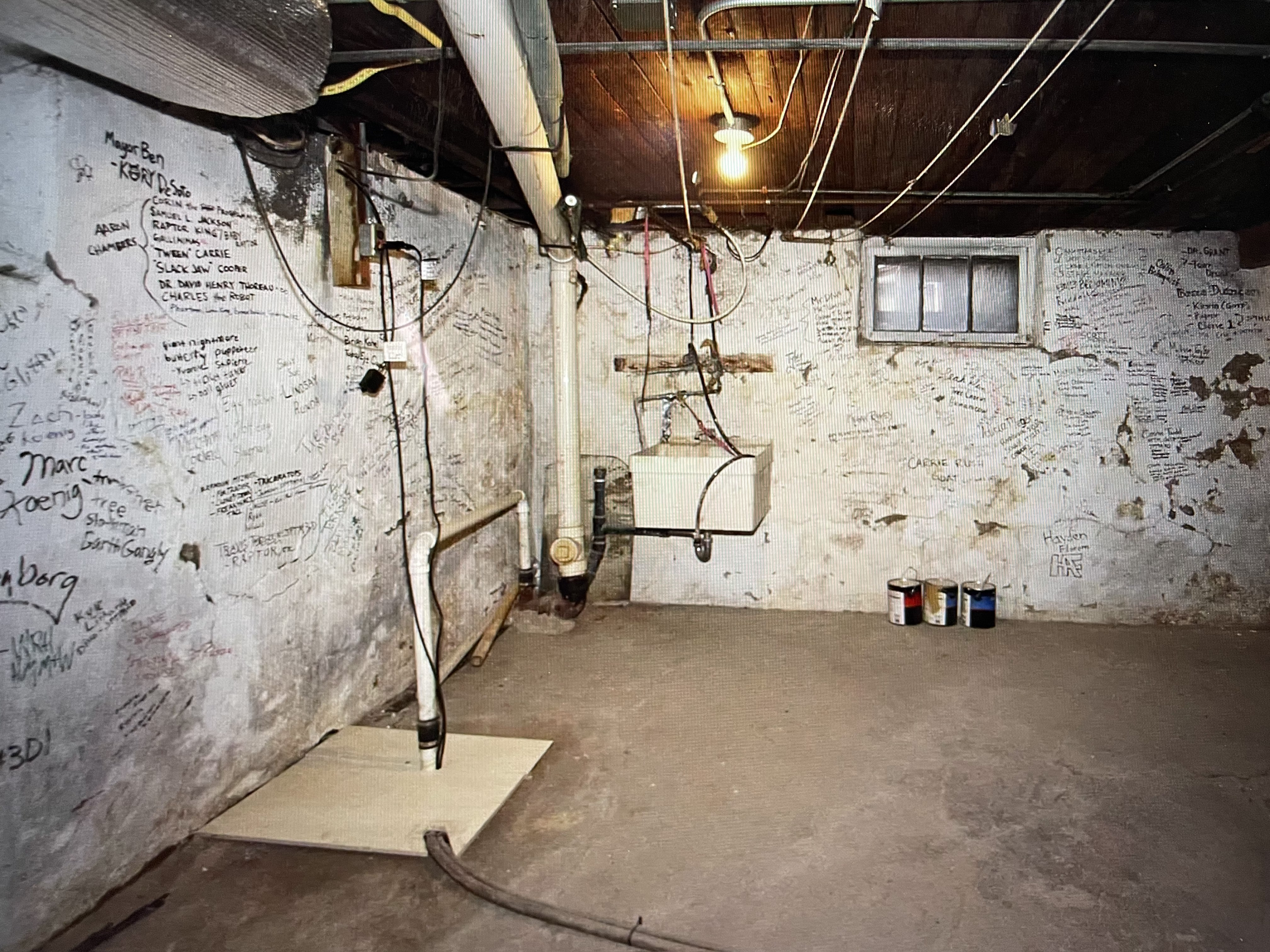
a photo of the signature mural in the Albert Watkins house basement.

After rent charges increased to a level that the existing roommates could no longer afford, the house was sold and slightly renovated for resale. The Albert Watkins House now available for purchase.
