= Woods Brothers Building =

- U.S. National Register of Historic Places
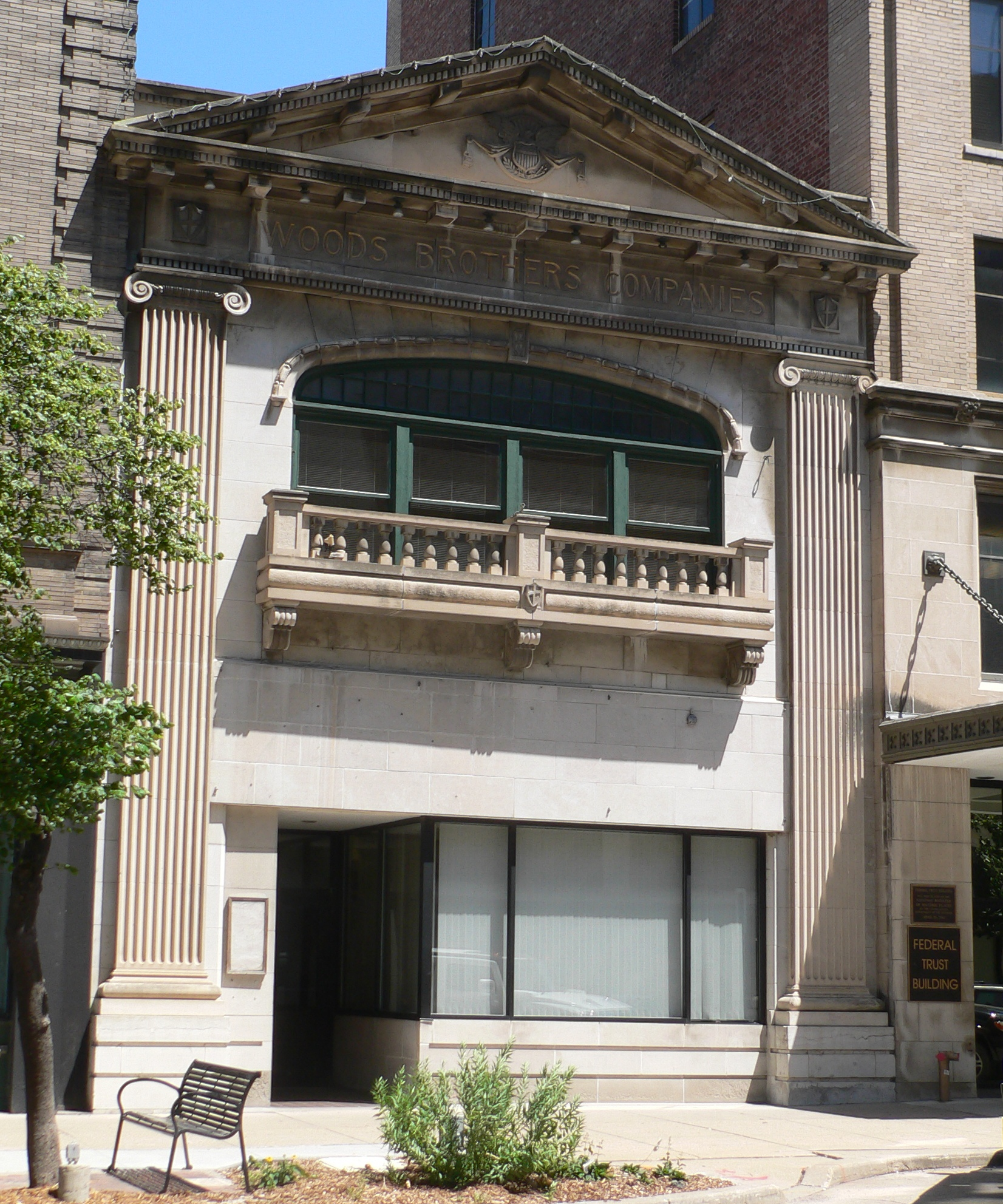
- The building in 2012

- Location within Nebraska Location within the United States
- Location: 132 South 13th Street, Lincoln, Nebraska
- Coordinates: 40°48′46″N 96°42′08″W
- Area: less than one acre
- Built: 1914
- Built by: Woods Brothers Construction Company
- Architect: Woods Brothers Construction Company
- Architectural style: Late 19th and 20th Century Revivals
- NRHP reference No.: 80002455
- Added to NRHP: September 18, 1980

The Woods Brothers Building is a historic building in Lincoln, Nebraska. It was built in 1914 by the Woods Brothers Construction Company, and designed in the Roman eclectic architectural style by engineers of the company. The Woods Brothers Construction Company, which built neighborhoods in Lincoln and airports in Missouri and Kansas, was headquartered here until 1939. Inside, there is a marble staircase. The building has been listed on the National Register of Historic Places since September 18, 1980.
