= Palisade and Regent Apartments =

- U.S. National Register of Historic Places
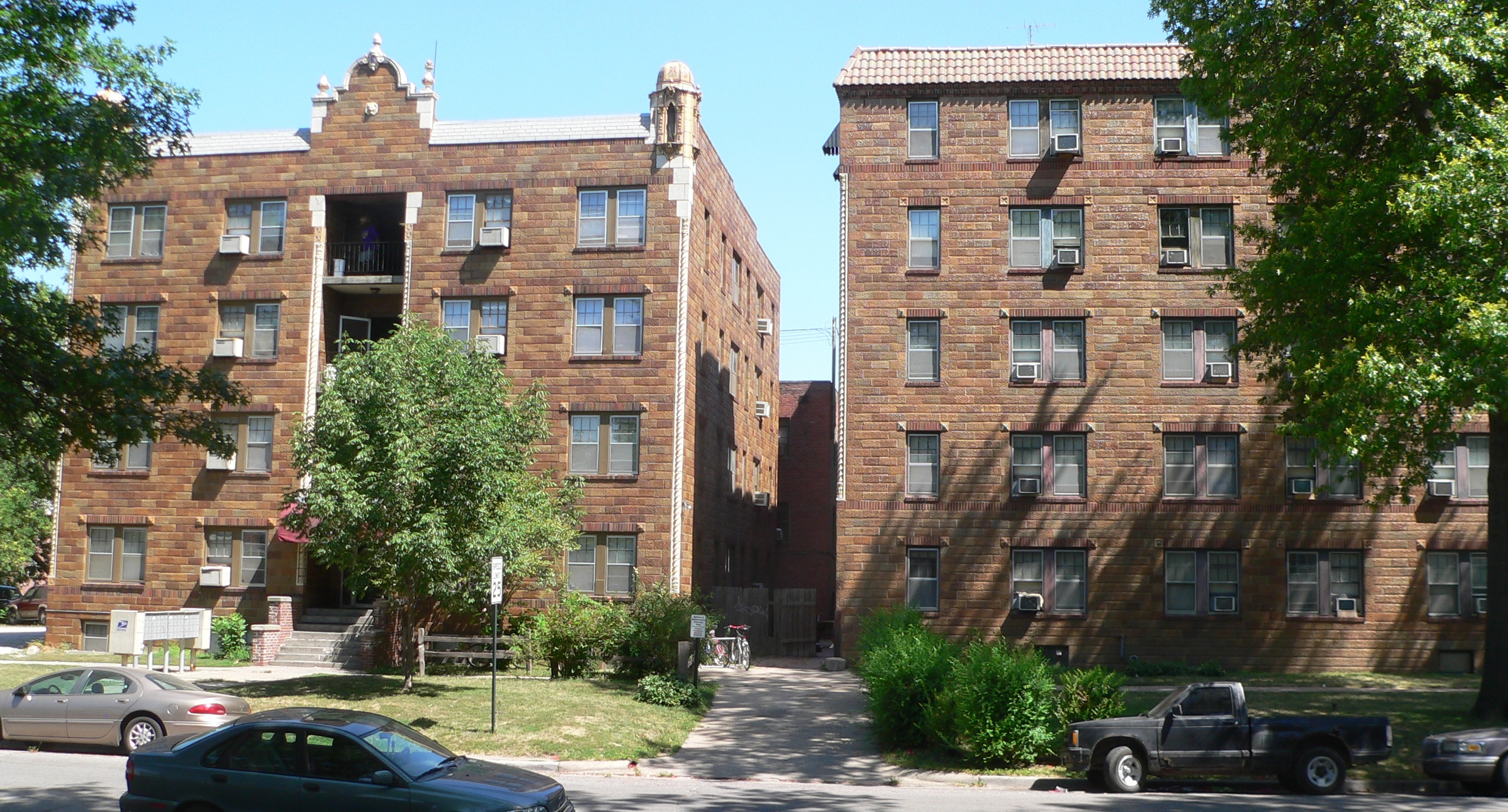
- The buildings in 2012

- Location within Nebraska Location within the United States
- Location: 1035 S. 17th St. and 1626 D Street, Lincoln, Nebraska
- Coordinates: 40°48′09″N 96°41′49″W
- Area: less than one acre
- Built: 1928
- Architect: Harry Goldstein
- NRHP reference No.: 98000191
- Added to NRHP: March 5, 1998

The Palisade and Regent Apartments are two historic buildings in Lincoln, Nebraska. The five-story Palisade was built in 1928, followed by the four-story Regent in 1929. They were both built by Harry Golstein, and designed in the Period Revival style. They have been listed on the National Register of Historic Places since March 5, 1998.
