= St. Charles Apartments =

- U.S. National Register of Historic Places
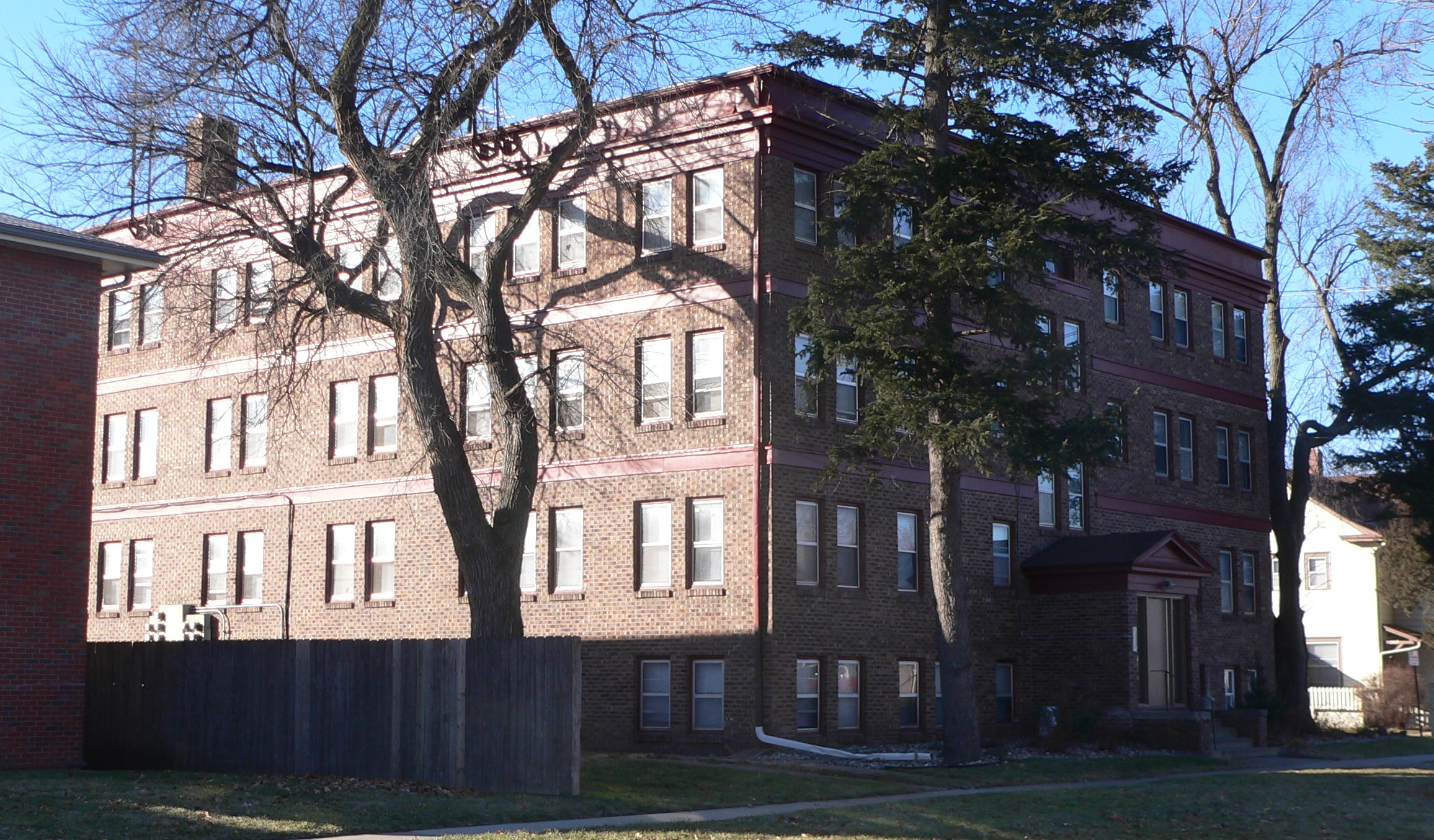
- The building in 2012

- Location within Nebraska Location within the United States
- Location: 4717 Baldwin Avenue, Lincoln, Nebraska
- Coordinates: 40°50′33″N 96°39′18″W
- Area: less than one acre
- Built: 1923
- Built by: William Henry Seng
- Architectural style: Classical Revival
- NRHP reference No.: 85002138
- Added to NRHP: September 12, 1985

St. Charles Apartments is a historic apartment building in Lincoln, Nebraska. It was built in 1923-1924 by William Henry Seng, and designed in the Classical Revival style. Seng owned the building until 1938, and he died in 1958. It has been listed on the National Register of Historic Places since September 12, 1985.
