= Frank M. Spalding House =

- U.S. National Register of Historic Places
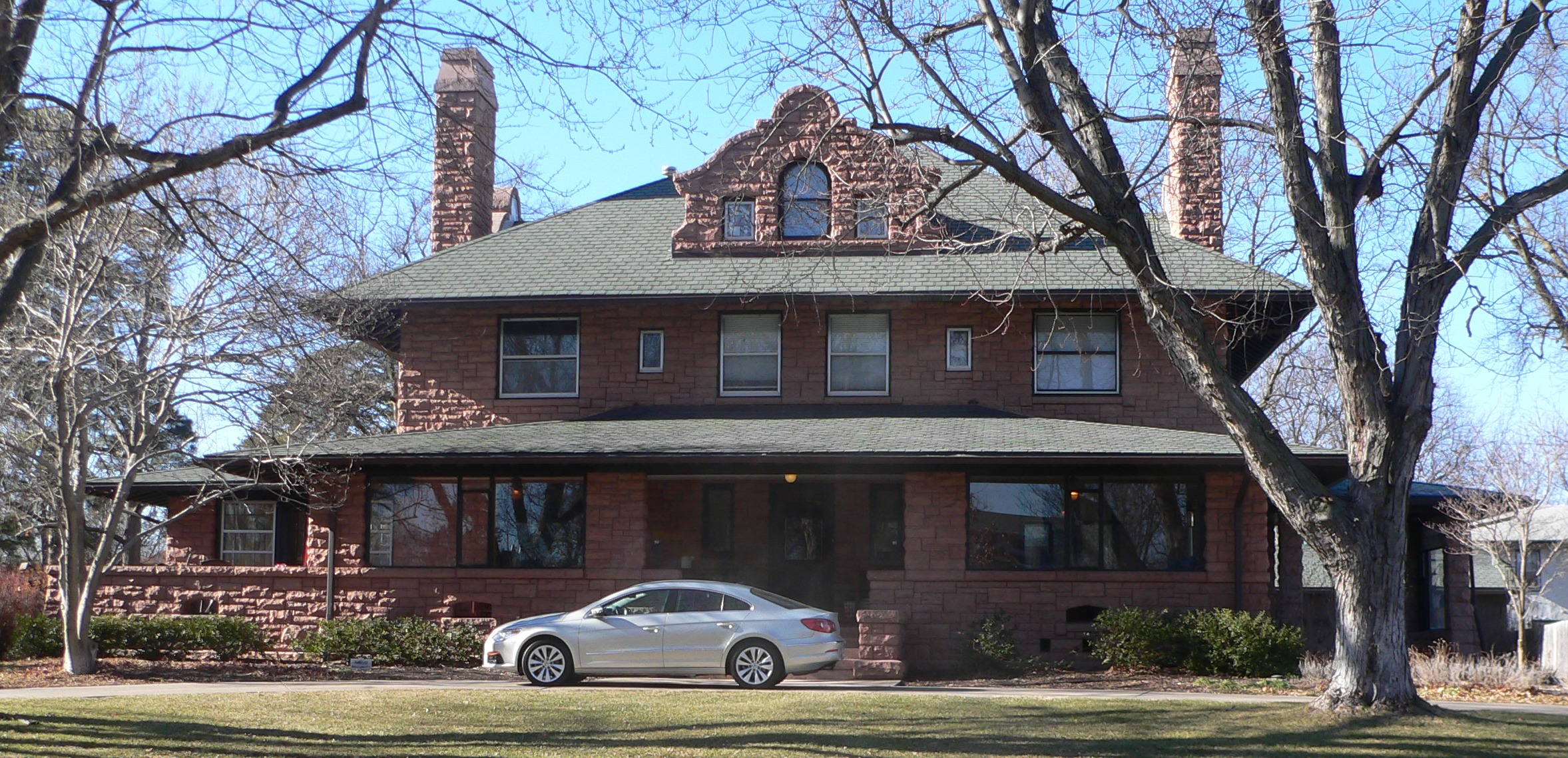
- The house in 2012

- Location within Nebraska Location within the United States
- Location: 2221 Sheridan Boulevard, Lincoln, Nebraska
- Coordinates: 40°47′27″N 96°41′03″W
- Area: 0.4 acres (0.16 ha)
- Built: 1909
- Built by: Peter Hansen; Frank Ostrander
- Architect: Ferdinand Comstock Fiske
- Architectural style: Mission Revival
- NRHP reference No.: 99000386
- Added to NRHP: March 25, 1999

The Frank M. Spalding House is a historic house in Lincoln, Nebraska. It was built by Peter Hansen and Frank Ostrander in 1909, and designed in the Mission Revival style by architect Ferdinand Comstock Fiske. Spalding died in 1914, and his widow and children lived here until 1920. It remained a private residence until the 1960s, when it was converted into a convent for the Sisters of the Blessed Sacrament, and it was later remodelled into a family property again. It has been listed on the National Register of Historic Places since March 25, 1999.
