= Jasper Newton Bell House =

- U.S. National Register of Historic Places
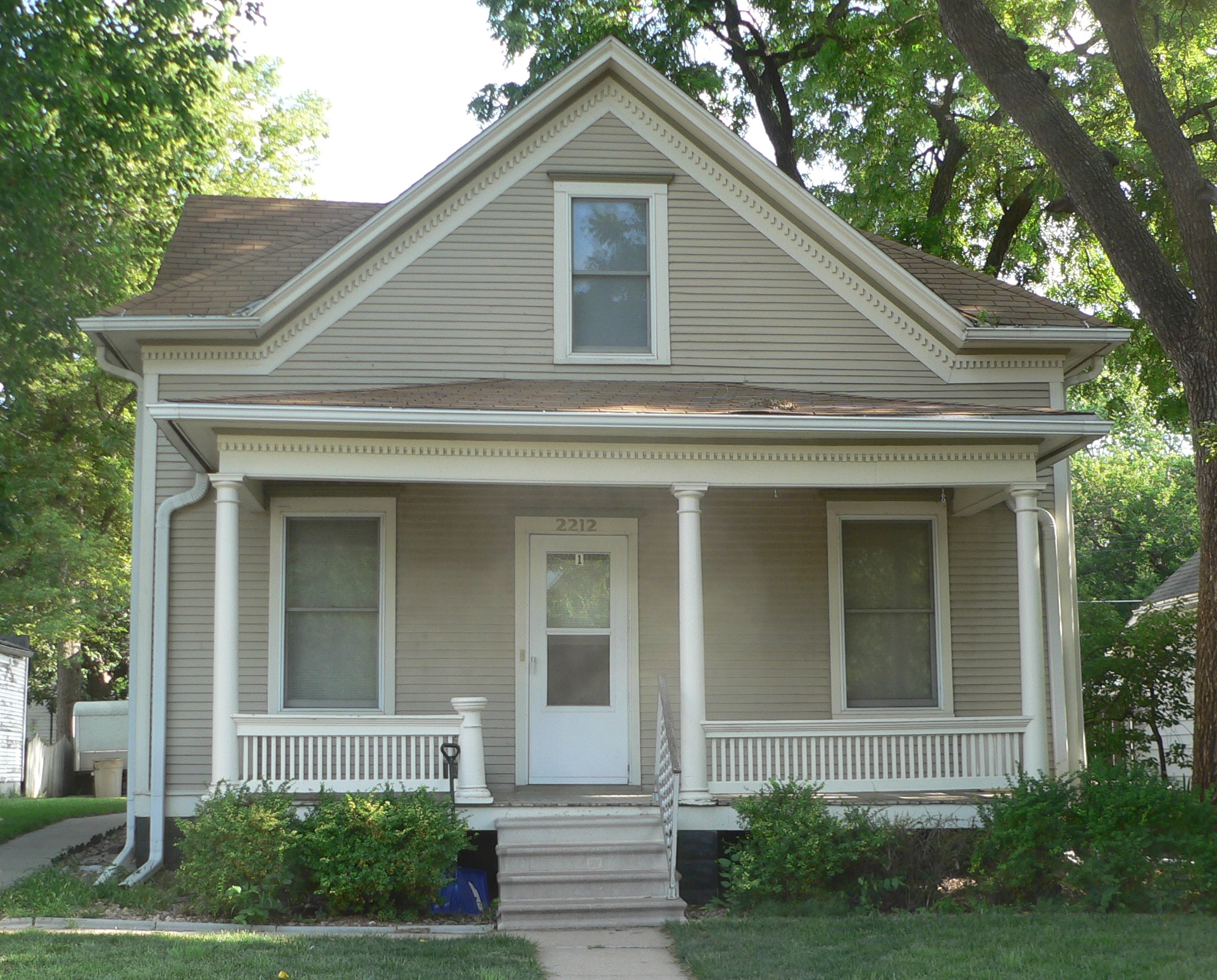
- The house in 2012

- Location within Nebraska Location within the United States
- Location: 2212 Sheldon Street, Lincoln, Nebraska
- Coordinates: 40°49′22″N 96°41′21″W
- Area: less than one acre
- Built: 1913
- Built by: Jasper Newton Bell
- Architectural style: Renaissance Revival
- NRHP reference No.: 84002483
- Added to NRHP: June 21, 1984

The Jasper Newton Bell House is a historic one-and-a-half-story house in Lincoln, Nebraska. It was built in 1913 by Jasper Newton Bell, a carpenter, and designed in the Renaissance Revival style, with "a nearly symmetrical three-bay front facade, corner pilasters and dentilled entablature, and a two-bay front porch supported by Tuscan columns." According to architect David Ord Wallace in the National Register of Historic Places form, "the Jasper N. Bell house stands as a notable and dignified product, fully American in association, and a testament to both the conservatism and the competence of vernacular builders in the state of Nebraska." It has been listed on the National Register of Historic Places since June 21, 1984.
