= Nimrod Ross House =

- U.S. National Register of Historic Places
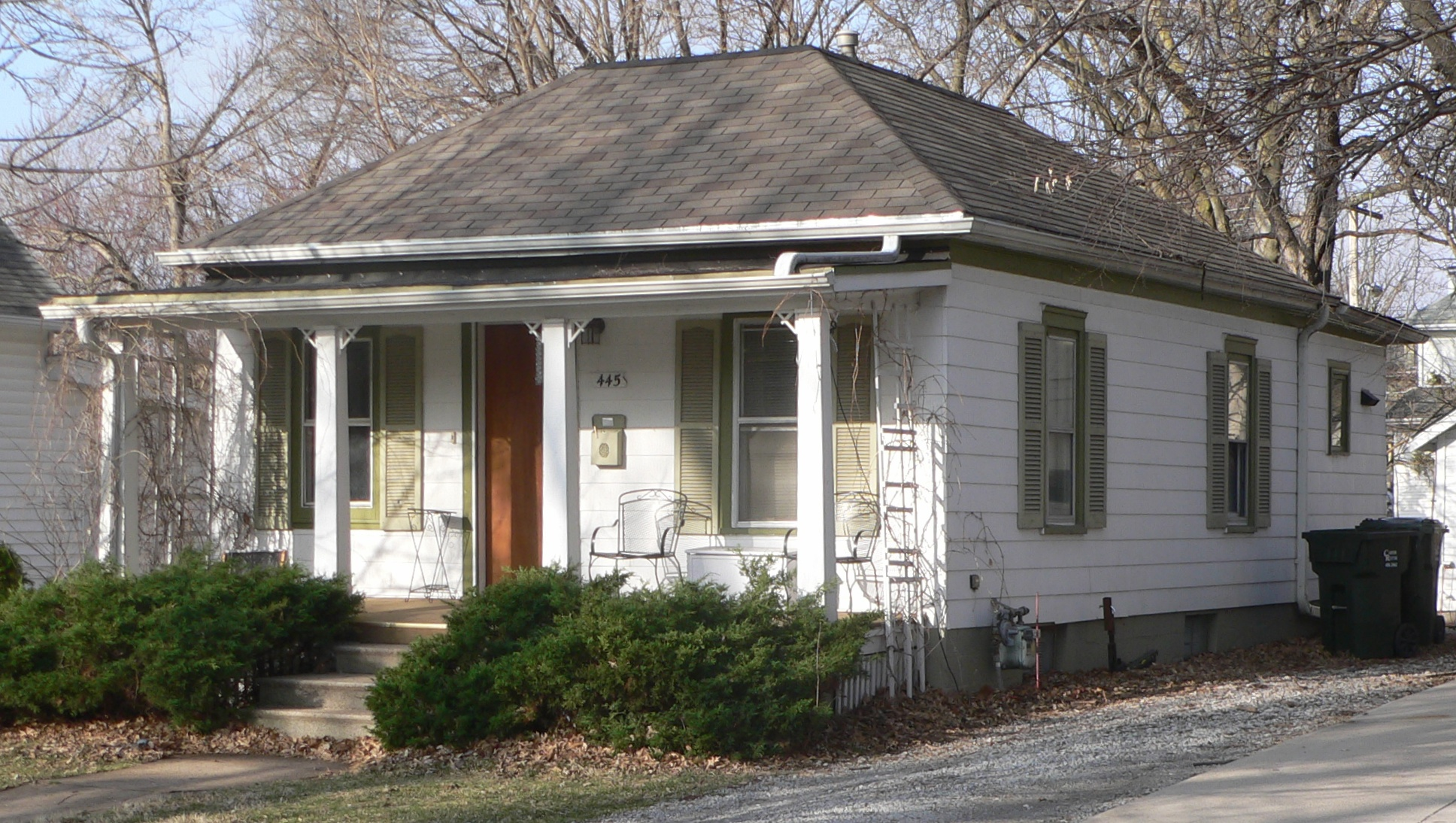
- The house in 2012

- Location within Nebraska Location within the United States
- Location: 445 S. 30th Street, Lincoln, Nebraska
- Coordinates: 40°48′28″N 96°40′37″W
- Area: less than one acre
- Built: 1903
- Architectural style: Late 19th And 20th Century Revivals
- MPS: African American Historic and Architectural Resources in Lincoln, Nebraska MPS
- NRHP reference No.: 99000747
- Added to NRHP: June 25, 1999

The Nimrod Ross House is a historic cottage in Lincoln, Nebraska. Probably built by carpenter Henry Brueckner in 1903, it belonged to Nimrod and Ellen Ross from 1904 to 1917. Nimrod Ross was a freedman, who was born a slave in Tennessee in 1863 and became one of the first African-American police officers in Lincoln, Nebraska in the early 1900s. The house has been listed on the National Register of Historic Places since June 25, 1999.
