= Old Main, Nebraska Wesleyan University =

- U.S. National Register of Historic Places
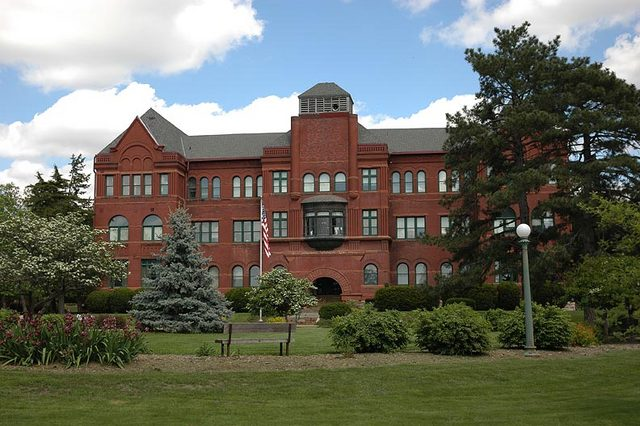
- The building in 2007

- Location within Nebraska Location within the United States
- Location: 50th and St. Paul Streets, Lincoln, Nebraska
- Coordinates: 40°50′20″N 96°38′58″W
- Area: less than one acre
- Built: 1887
- Architect: Gibbs & Parker
- Architectural style: Romanesque Revival
- NRHP reference No.: 75001097
- Added to NRHP: May 21, 1975

Old Main is a historic three-story building on the campus of Nebraska Wesleyan University in Lincoln, Nebraska. It was built in 1887–1888, and designed in the Romanesque Revival style by Gibbs and Parker. It was the administration building on the NWU campus until 1975. It has been listed on the National Register of Historic Places since May 21, 1975.
