= Helmer-Winnett-White Flats =

- U.S. National Register of Historic Places
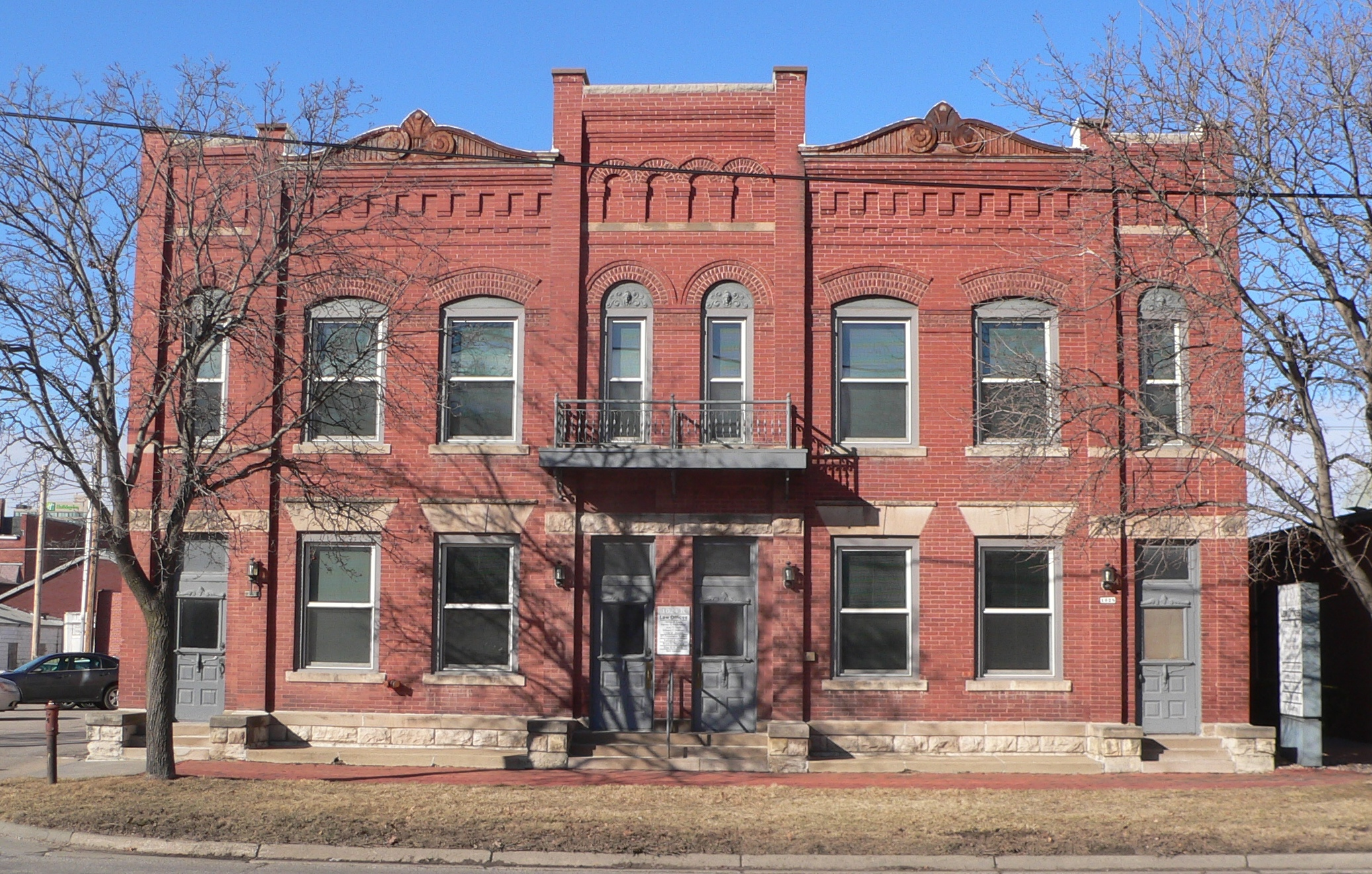
- The building in 2012

- Location within Nebraska Location within the United States
- Location: 1022--1028 K St., Lincoln, Nebraska
- Coordinates: 40°48′34″N 96°42′21″W
- Area: less than one acre
- Built: 1898
- Architectural style: Eclectic
- MPS: Nineteenth Century Terrace Houses TR
- NRHP reference No.: 79003690
- Added to NRHP: October 1, 1979

The Helmer-Winnett-White Flats is a historic two-story row house in Lincoln, Nebraska. It was built in 1898 on land owned by William T. White for Louis Helmer, who served as a member of the Nebraska House of Representatives, and H. J. Winnett, who served as the mayor of Lincoln in 1899. It was designed in the Eclectic style, with "decorative brickwork in parapet with scrolled terra-cotta coping." It has been listed on the National Register of Historic Places since October 1, 1979.
