= Harris House (Lincoln, Nebraska) =

- U.S. National Register of Historic Places
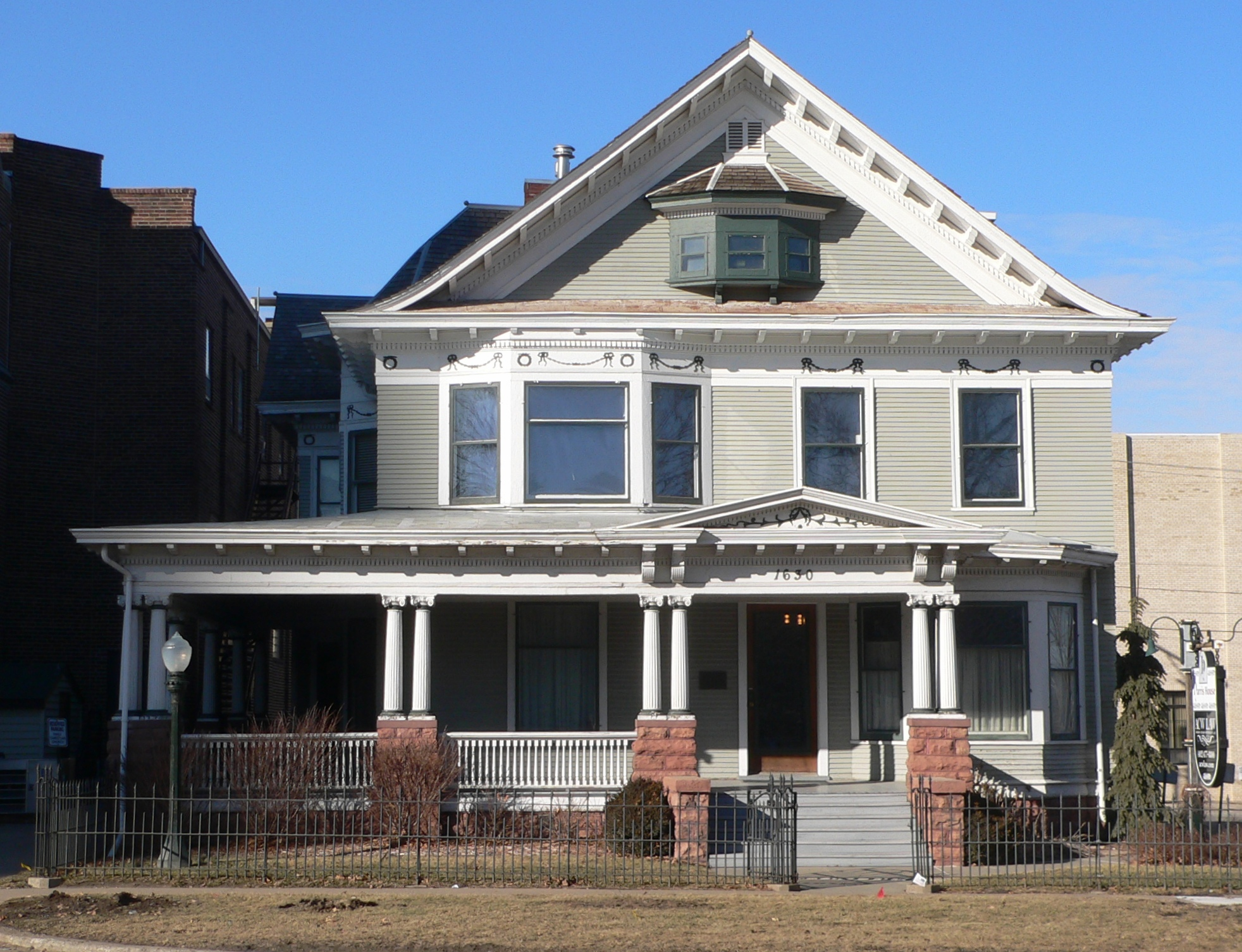
- The house in 2012

- Location within Nebraska Location within the United States
- Location: 1630 K Street, Lincoln, Nebraska
- Coordinates: 40°48′34″N 96°41′49″W
- Area: less than one acre
- Built: 1902
- Architectural style: Classical Revival
- NRHP reference No.: 82003194
- Added to NRHP: September 2, 1982

The Harris House is a historic two-and-a-half-story house in Lincoln, Nebraska. It was built in 1902 for Sarah Harris. Her husband George Samuel Harris worked for the railroad company and encouraged many immigrants from Eastern Europe to settle in Lincoln before his death in 1874. His widow published her memoirs as a pioneer in Nebraska. Many of their sons went on to success in business at a national scale. The house was designed in the Classical Revival style. It was purchased by the University of Nebraska–Lincoln chapter of Alpha Tau Omega fraternity in 1919. It has been listed on the National Register of Historic Places since September 2, 1982.
