= R.O. Stake House =

- U.S. National Register of Historic Places
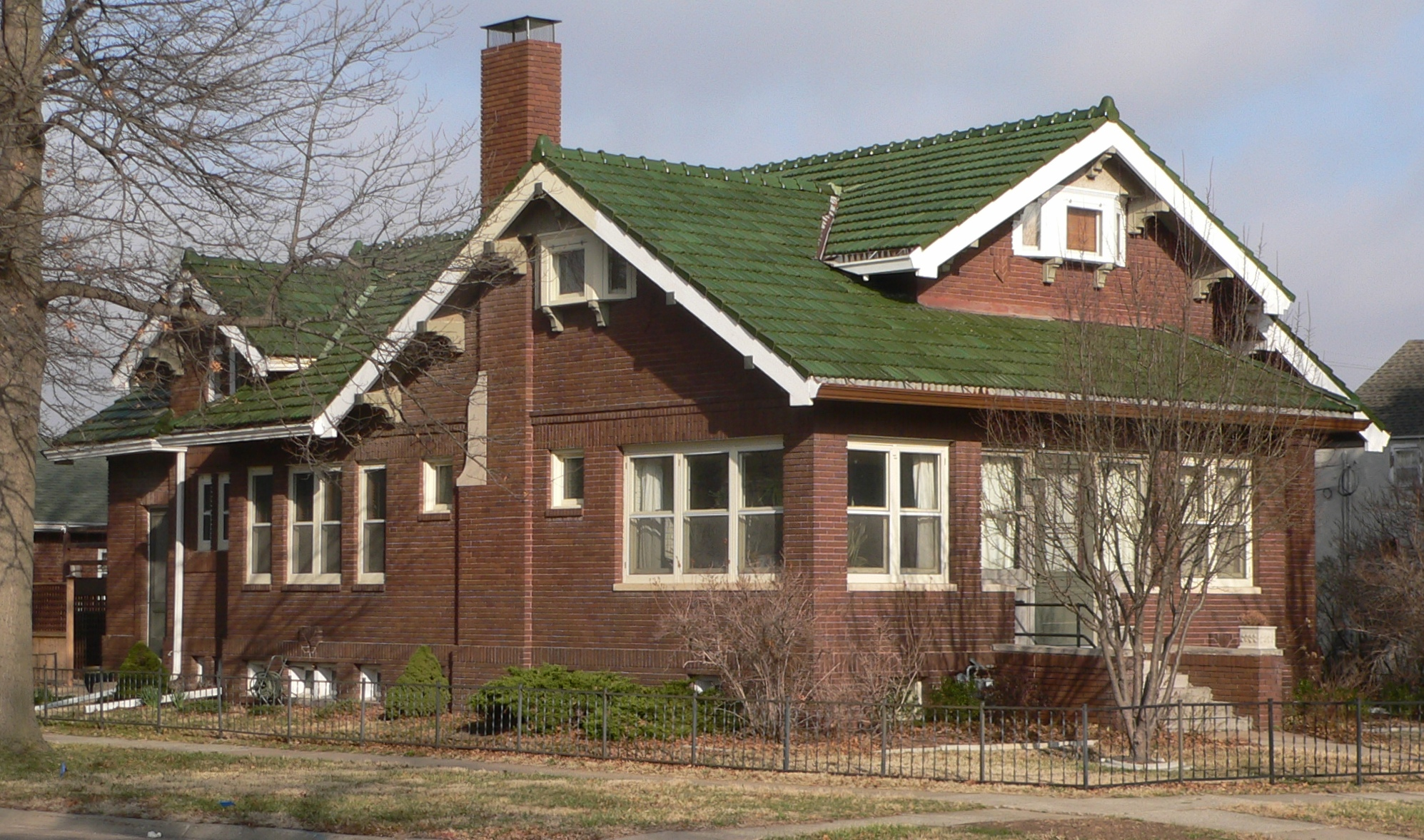
- The house in 2012

- Location within Nebraska Location within the United States
- Location: 145 S 28th Street, Lincoln, Nebraska
- Coordinates: 40°48′49″N 96°40′43″W
- Area: less than one acre
- Built: 1919
- Built by: R.O. Stake
- Architect: George A. Berlinghof
- Architectural style: American Craftsman
- NRHP reference No.: 05000357
- Added to NRHP: April 27, 2005

The R.O. Stake House is a historic house in Lincoln, Nebraska. It was built in 1919 by Reese O. Stake, and designed in the American Craftsman style by architect George A. Berlinghof. Stake built many houses in Lincoln, including his own house. According to the National Register of Historic Places form, "The bungalow has textured brown bricks cladding the structural-tile walls of the exterior, with restrained limestone trim on the south chimney and front steps. The wide eaves have stuccoed soffits and the raking eaves have substantial wooden brackets. The complex, interlocking gable roofs are permanently finished in glossy, green-glazed tiles." The house has been listed on the National Register of Historic Places since April 27, 2005.
