= R.O. Phillips House =

- R. O. Phillips House
- U.S. National Register of Historic Places
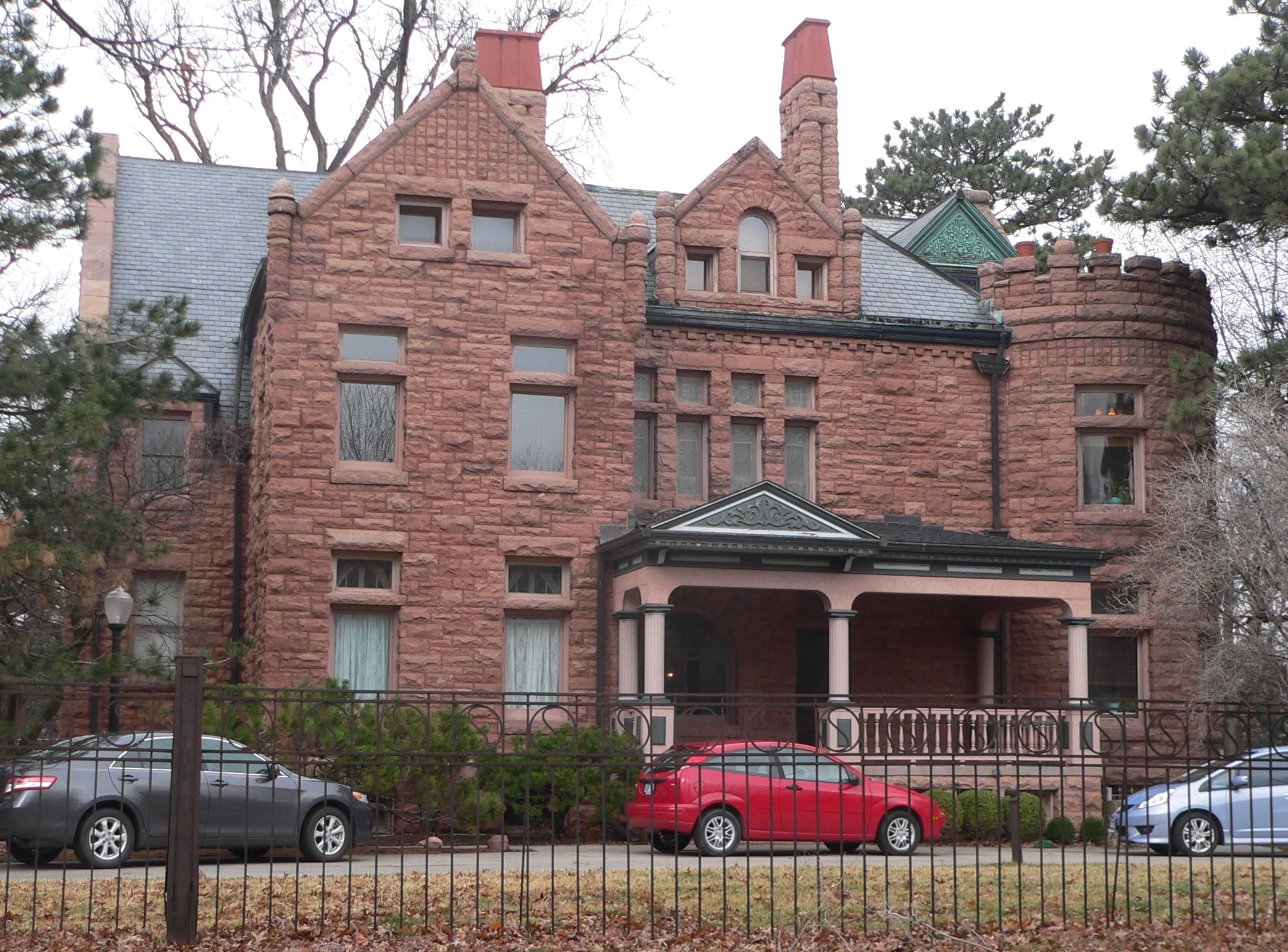
- The house in 2012

- Location within Nebraska Location within the United States
- Location: 1845 D St, Lincoln, Nebraska
- Coordinates: 40°48′08″N 96°41′38″W
- Area: less than one acre
- Built: 1889
- Architect: J. H. W. Hawkins
- Architectural style: Richardsonian Romanesque
- NRHP reference No.: 79001449
- Added to NRHP: November 29, 1979

The R.O. Phillips House is a historic house in Lincoln, Nebraska. It was built in 1889 for R.O. Phillips, a railroad lawyer who served as a member of the Nebraska House of Representatives. The house was designed in the Richardsonian Romanesque style by architect J. H. W. Hawkins. It has been listed on the National Register of Historic Places since November 29, 1979.
