= John M. Thayer House =

- U.S. National Register of Historic Places
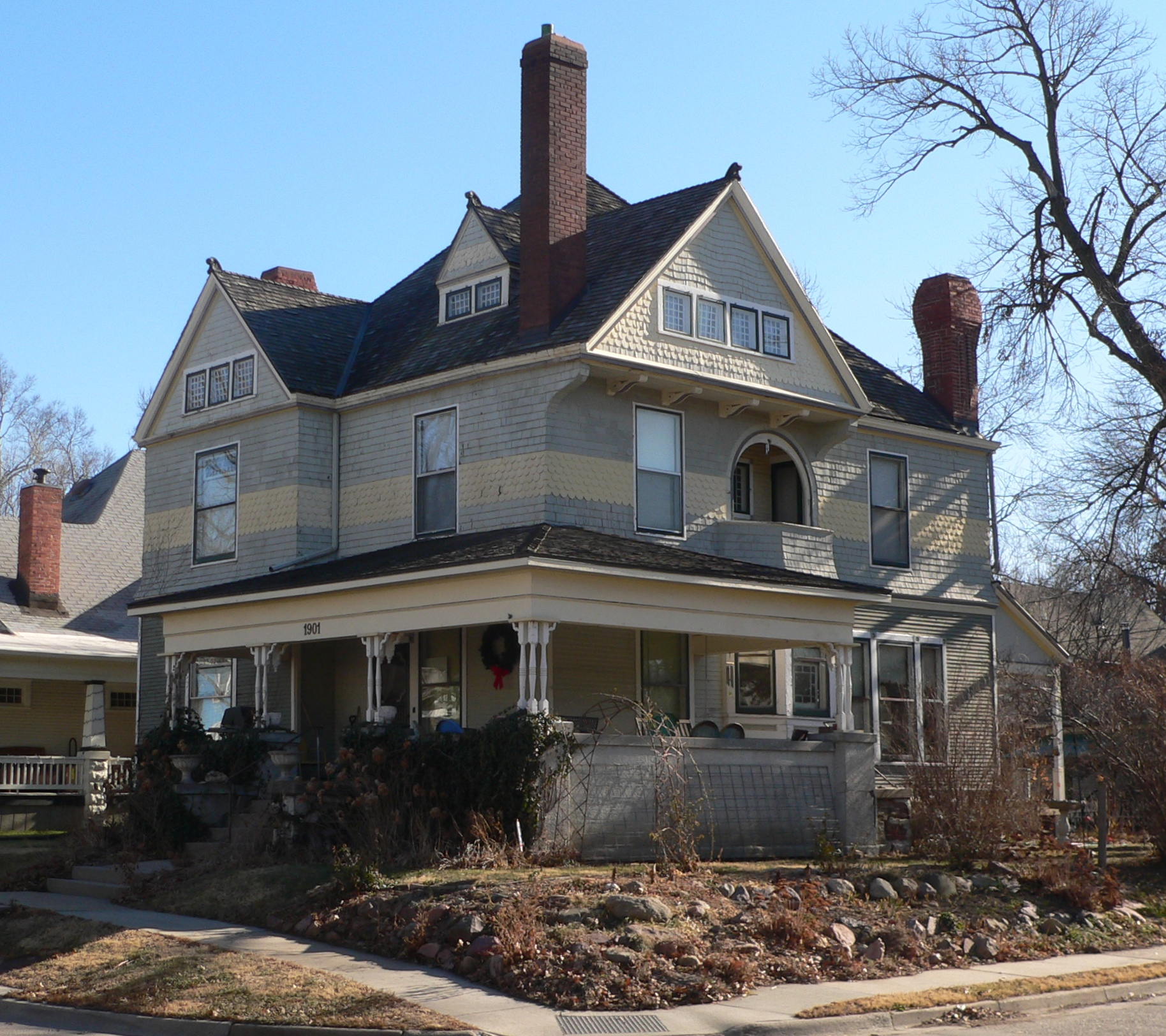
- The house in 2012

- Location within Nebraska Location within the United States
- Location: 1901 Prospect Street, Lincoln, Nebraska
- Coordinates: 40°47′42″N 96°41′36″W
- Area: less than one acre
- Built: 1889
- Built by: John F. Harrison
- Architect: G.W. Peters
- Architectural style: Queen Anne
- NRHP reference No.: 02001479
- Added to NRHP: December 5, 2002

The John M. Thayer House is a historic house in Lincoln, Nebraska. It was built in 1889 for John Milton Thayer, who served as a general in the Union Army during the American Civil War of 1861–1865, as a United States Senator from Nebraska from 1867 to 1871, as the 2nd Governor of Wyoming Territory from 1875 to 1878, and as the 6th Governor of Nebraska from 1887 to 1892. It was designed in the Queen Anne style. It has been listed on the National Register of Historic Places since December 5, 2002.
