= John H. and Christina Yost House =

- U.S. National Register of Historic Places
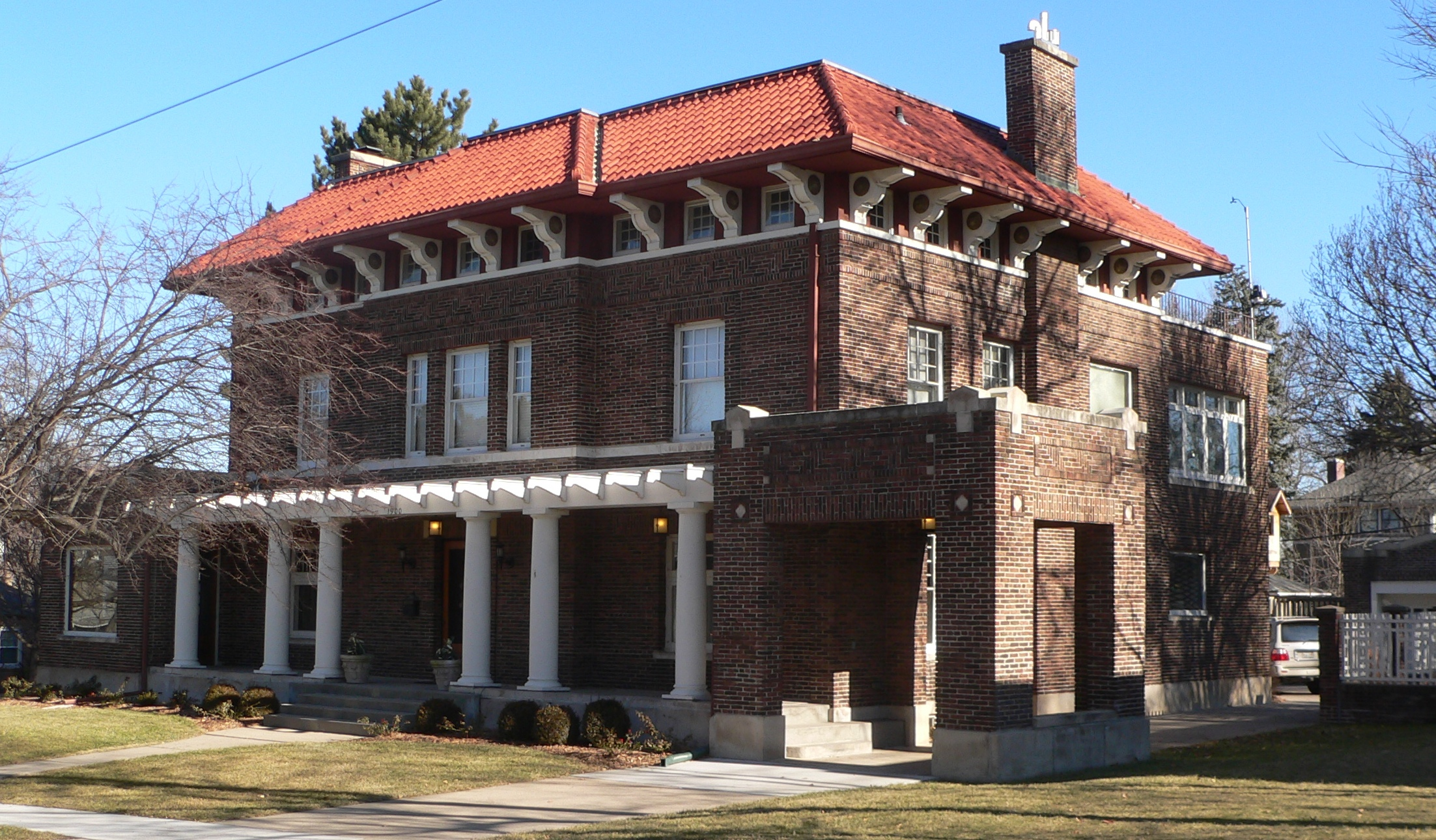
- The house in 2012

- Location within Nebraska Location within the United States
- Location: 1900 South 25th Street, Lincoln, Nebraska
- Coordinates: 40°47′32″N 96°41′00″W
- Area: less than one acre
- Built: 1912
- Built by: Nathan Bishop
- Architect: George A. Brilinghof
- Architectural style: Renaissance Revival
- NRHP reference No.: 02000410
- Added to NRHP: April 26, 2002

The John H. and Christina Yost House is a historic house in Lincoln, Nebraska. It was built by Nathan Bishop with red bricks and limestone in 1912, and designed in the Renaissance Revival style by architect George A. Brilinghof. The owner, John Y. Yost, was a Russian immigrant of German descent who first arrived in Wisconsin in 1876 and moved to Nebraska in 1877. He lived in the house with his wife Christina, who was also a Russian immigrant, until his death in 1939. It has been listed on the National Register of Historic Places since April 26, 2002.
