= Guy A. Brown House =

- U.S. National Register of Historic Places
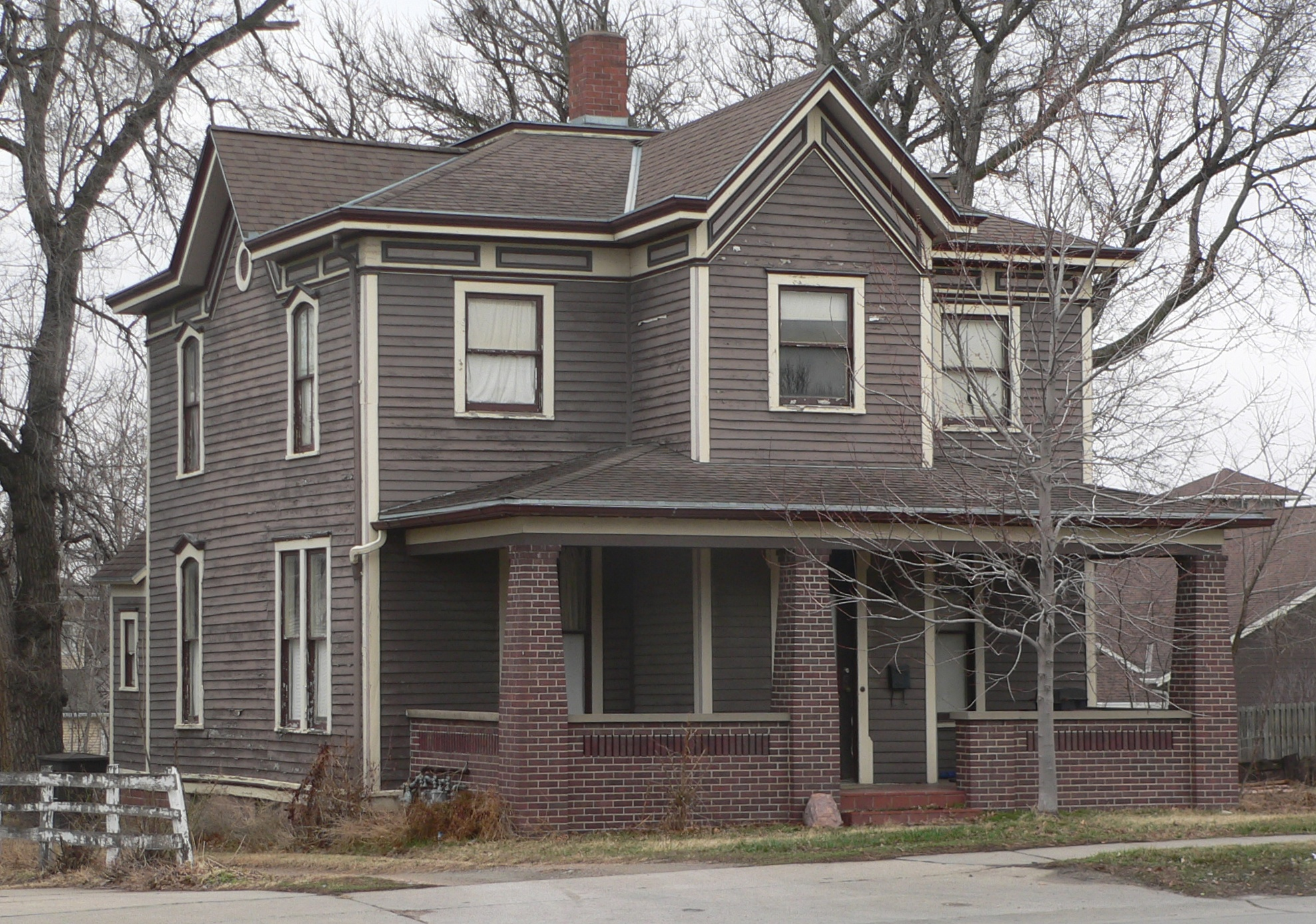
- The house in 2012

- Location within Nebraska Location within the United States
- Location: 219-221 S 27th Street, Lincoln, Nebraska
- Coordinates: 40°48′43″N 96°40′58″W
- Area: 0.3 acres (0.12 ha)
- Built: 1874
- Architectural style: Italianate
- NRHP reference No.: 98000195
- Added to NRHP: March 5, 1998

The Guy A. Brown House is a historic two-story house in Lincoln, Nebraska. It was built in 1874 as a private residence for Guy A. Brown, a Civil War veteran who became Nebraska's State Librarian as well as the clerk and reporter of the Nebraska Supreme Court. The house was designed in the Italianate style, with an American Craftsman porch. It was remodelled as a duplex in 1935. It has been listed on the National Register of Historic Places since March 5, 1998.
