= Herter Farmstead =

- U.S. National Register of Historic Places
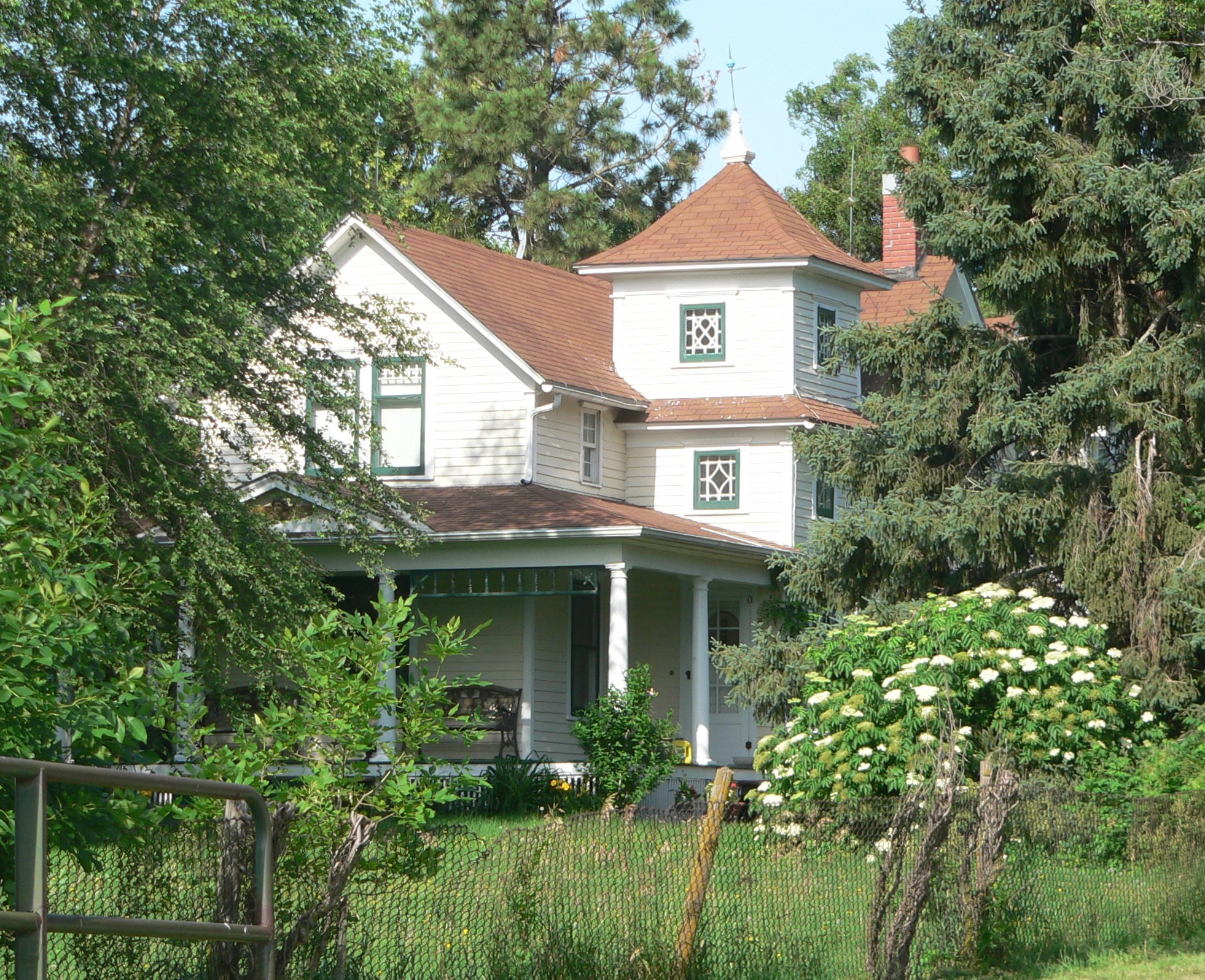
- The house in 2013

- Location within Nebraska Location within the United States
- Location: 4949 South 148th, Walton, Nebraska
- Coordinates: 40°45′51″N 96°31′16″W
- Area: 20 acres (8.1 ha)
- Built: 1876
- Architectural style: Queen Anne
- NRHP reference No.: 00000835
- Added to NRHP: July 24, 2000

The Herter Farmstead is an estate with a historic farm house and several outbuildings in Walton, Nebraska. The two-story house was built in 1876 for Abraham Herter, an immigrant from Switzerland. In 1892, his son, Jacob W. Herter, decided to redesign the house in the Queen Anne style, with a tower and classical columns. Edward, the third-generation property owned, inherited the house in 1960, followed by his daughter Norma in 1973, who lived here with her husband, Wayne Hagaman. The property has been listed on the National Register of Historic Places since July 24, 2000.
