= Arthur C. Ziemer House =

- U.S. National Register of Historic Places
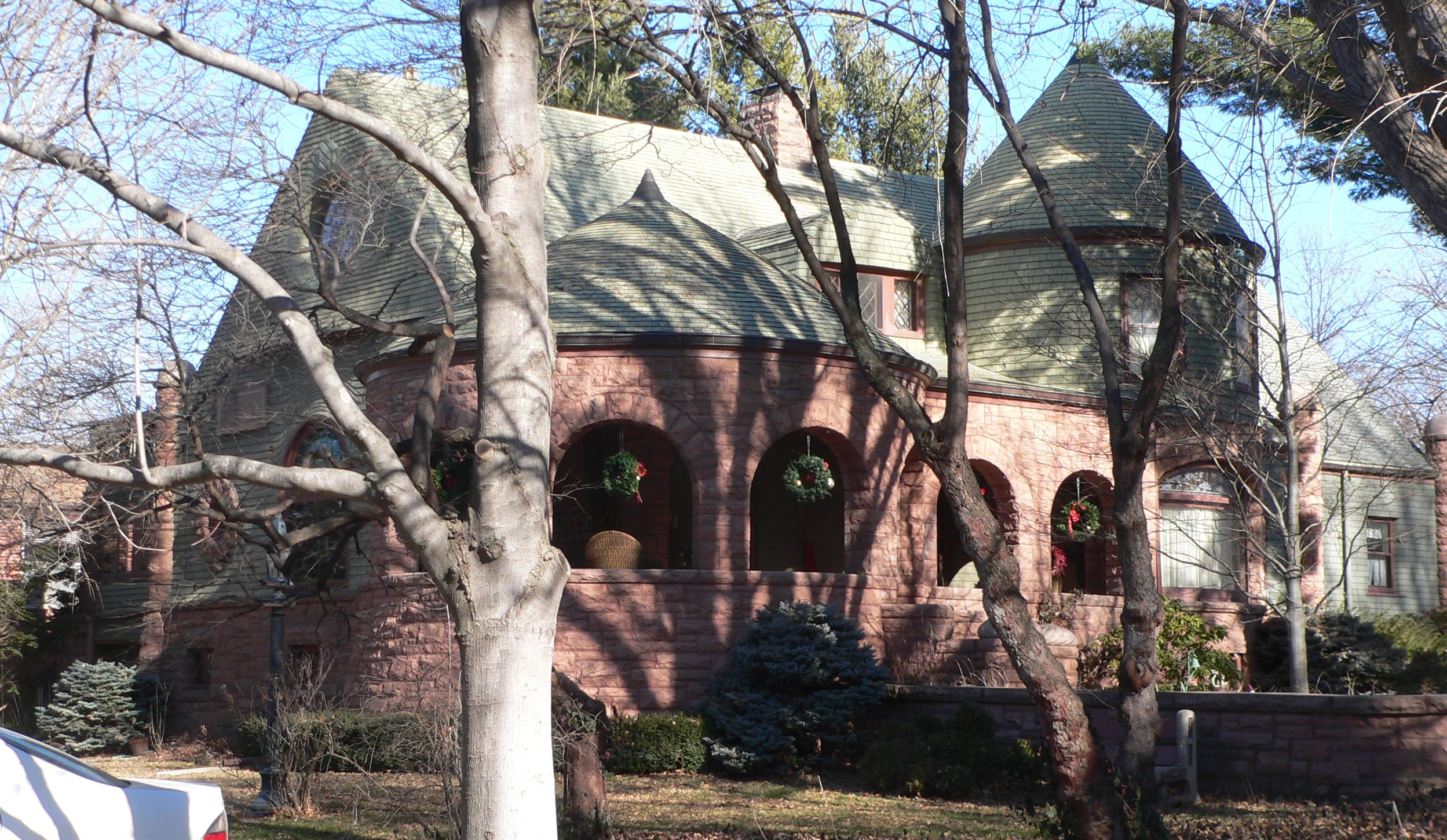
- The house in 2012

- Location within Nebraska Location within the United States
- Location: 2030 Euclid Street, Lincoln, Nebraska
- Coordinates: 40°47′39″N 96°41′28″W
- Area: 1 acre (0.40 ha)
- Built: 1909
- Architectural style: Shingle Style
- NRHP reference No.: 77000832
- Added to NRHP: November 23, 1977

The Arthur C. Ziemer House is a historic house in Lincoln, Nebraska. It was built in 1909-1910 for Arthur Z C. Ziemer, a railroad ticket agent, interior designer, and Christian Science healer. Ziemer first arrived in Lincoln in 1870, and he died in 1913. The house was it was designed in the Shingle style. It has been listed on the National Register of Historic Places since November 23, 1977.
