= Sky Park Manor =

- U.S. National Register of Historic Places
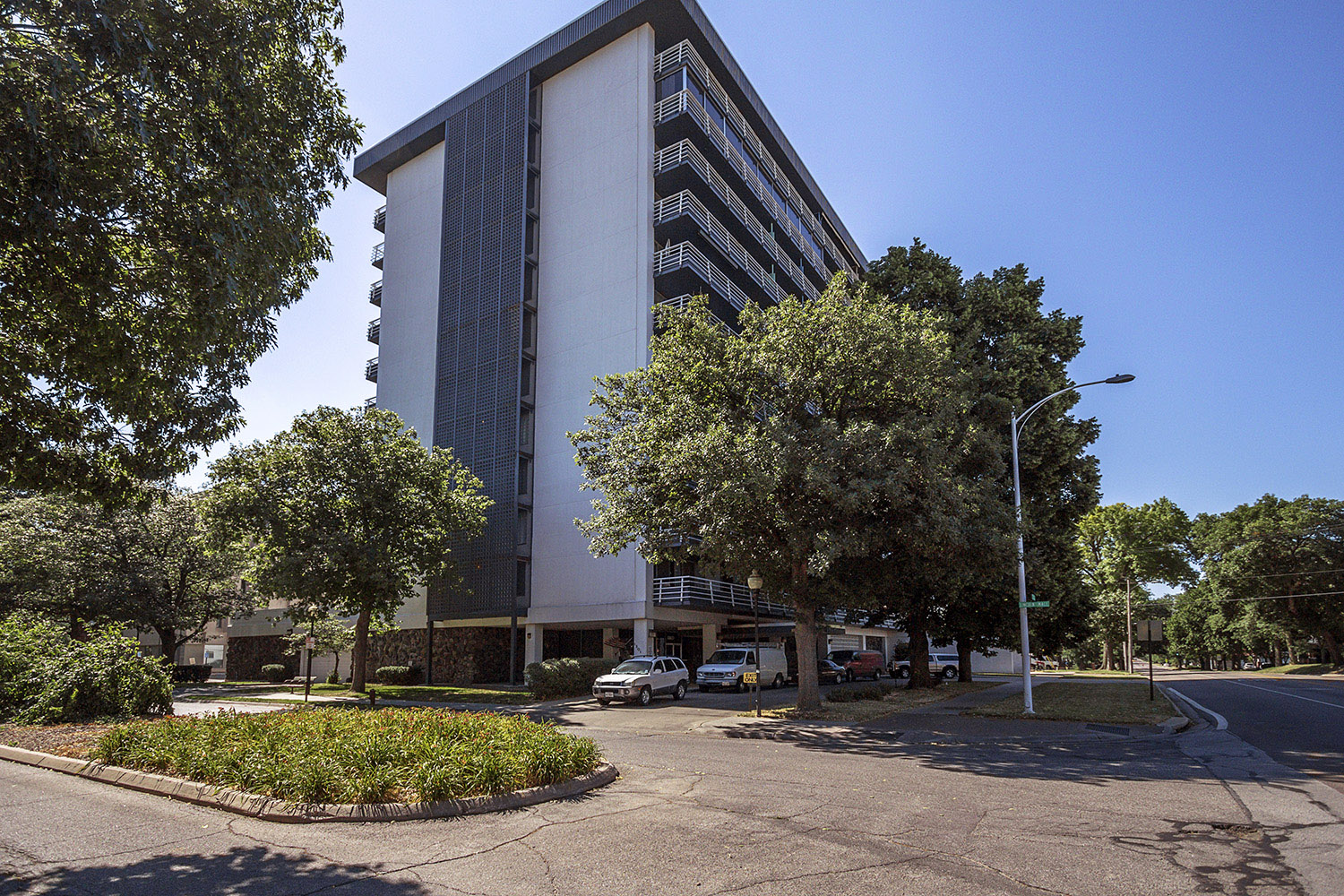

- Location within Nebraska Location within the United States
- Location: 1301 Lincoln Mall, Lincoln, Nebraska
- Coordinates: 40°48′29.1″N 96°42′8.29″W
- Area: less than one acre
- Built: 1961
- Architect: Selmer A. Solheim & Associates, Olson Construction
- Architectural style: Modern Movement, International Style
- NRHP reference No.: 16000515
- Added to NRHP: August 8, 2016

Sky Park Manor is a twelve-story, luxury apartment building built in 1963 by Selmer A. Solheim and Olson Construction in Lincoln, Nebraska. The apartment building is listed on the National Register of Historic Places for its architectural significance as emblematic of the International Style of architecture.
