= South Bottoms Historic District =

Historic district in Nebraska, United States

- U.S. National Register of Historic Places
- U.S. Historic district
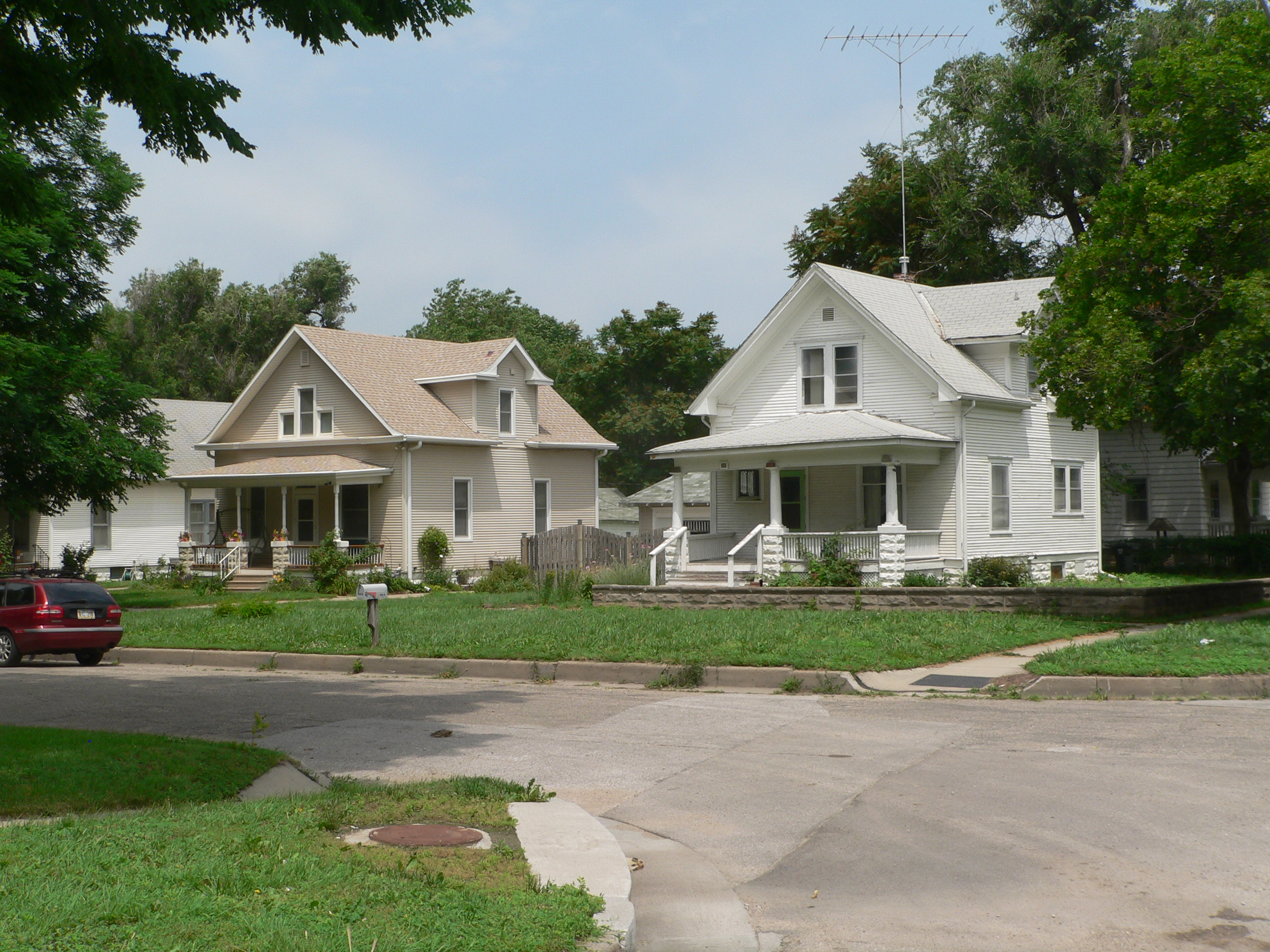
- Houses on B Street

- Location within Nebraska Location within the United States
- Location: Roughly bounded by M and J and H and G Sts., Second and Ninth Sts., and W. B Sts., and Salt Creek, Lincoln, Nebraska
- Coordinates: 40°48′15″N 96°42′55″W
- Area: 264 acres (107 ha)
- Architect: Rohrig, Jacob; Et al.
- NRHP reference No.: 86001717
- Added to NRHP: July 17, 1986

The South Bottoms Historic District is a residential neighborhood of Lincoln, Nebraska. The district includes 1050 contributing structures, with a relatively small proportion of 148 non-contributing structures. The neighborhood was settled primarily by Volga Germans in the late 19th and early 20th centuries. The houses are primarily wood-framed single-family residences, with some commercial structures on F Street between 2nd and 5th Streets. The houses mix vernacular American house construction with wood frame traditions brought from Russia by the residents. The neighborhood is roughly bounded by A and M Streets from Eighth Street to the city limits.

The area along Salt Creek was settled by Volga Germans starting in the 1870s, attracted by the inexpensive housing found in the Salt Creek floodplain. Immigrants from individual Russian villages tended to stick together. For instance, the Norker Bottom section was inhabited by people from the villages of Norka, Kukkus and Huck, while the Franker Bottom section housed people from Frank, Balzer and Beideck. Since many of the immigrants were farmers, many people from the South Bottoms spent May through November working in the sugar beet fields in central Nebraska.

Typical houses in the South Bottoms neighborhood have front or side porches and are on raised concrete block foundations. Porch columns are supported by masonry piers, and houses typically have hipped roofs. A number of churches are found in the neighborhood.

The South Bottoms Historic District was placed on the National Register of Historic Places on July 17, 1986.
