= Royer-Williams House =

- U.S. National Register of Historic Places
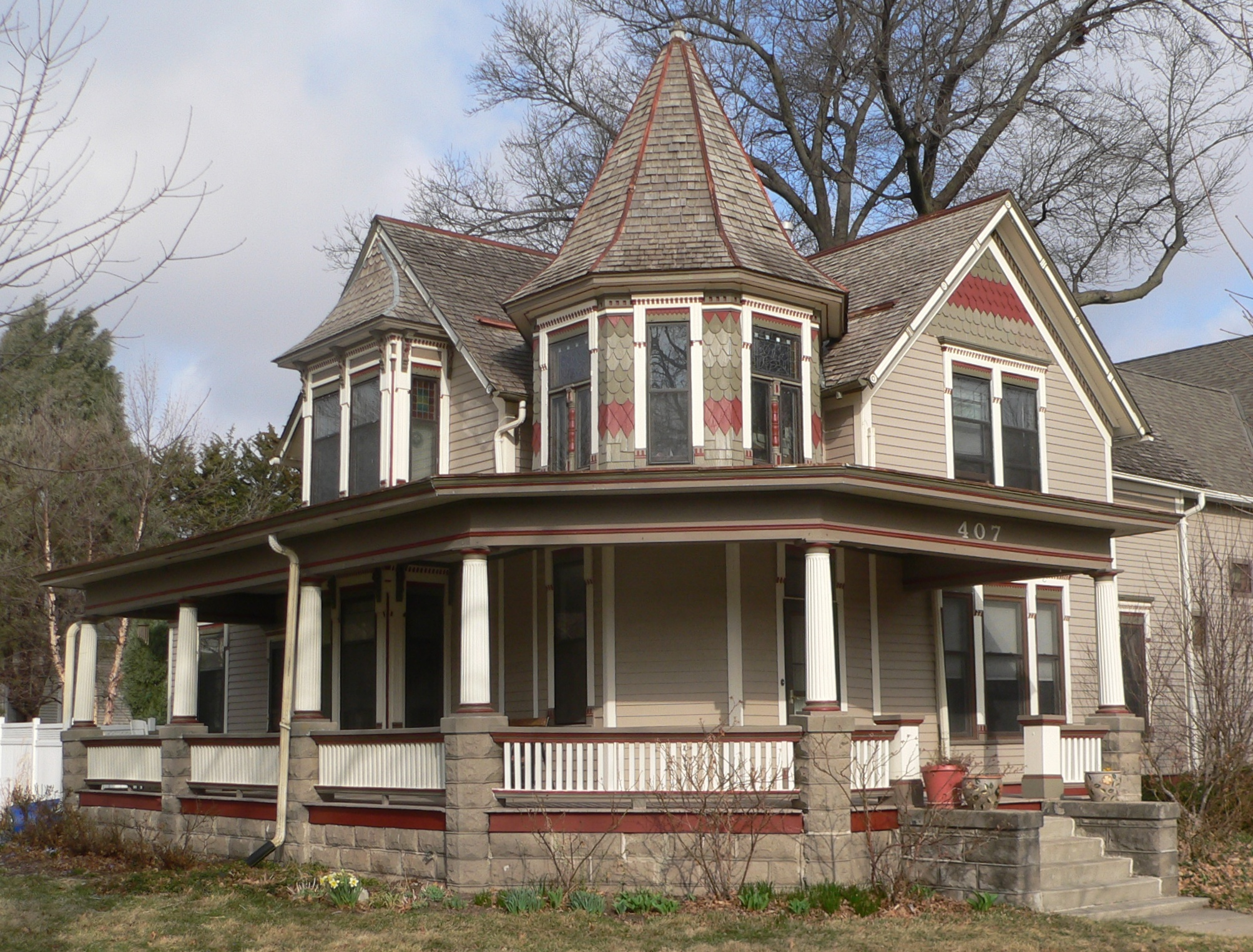
- The house in 2012

- Location within Nebraska Location within the United States
- Location: 407 North 26th Street, Lincoln, Nebraska
- Coordinates: 40°49′01″N 96°41′02″W
- Area: less than one acre
- Built: 1887
- Built by: Henry Royer
- Architectural style: Queen Anne
- NRHP reference No.: 82003195
- Added to NRHP: June 14, 1982

The Royer-Williams House is a historic house in Lincoln, Nebraska. It was built by Henry Royer in 1887, and designed in the Queen Anne architectural style, with "the hood-moldings of the windows, the prominent square bay window of the south facade complete with Victorian trim and brackets, and the varied imbrication on the second floor of the tower and on the concave hip of the south bay window.". In 1898, it was purchased by T. F. A. Williams, who lived here with his wife, sociologist Hattie Plum Williams who wrote books about German Russians. It has been listed on the National Register of Historic Places since June 14, 1982.
