= Burnett House =

Burnett House or Burnette House may refer to:

in Australia

- Burnett House (Darwin, Northern Territory), heritage building

in the United States (by state then town)

- Burnett House (Searcy, Arkansas), listed on the National Register of Historic Places (NRHP) in White County
- Burnett House (Orlando, Florida), the official residence of the President of the University of Central Florida
- H. C. Burnett House, Boise, Idaho, NRHP-listed in Ada County
- Burnett-Montgomery House, Fairfield, Iowa, NRHP-listed in Jefferson County
- Aubrey Burnett House, Oakland, Kentucky, NRHP-listed in Warren County
- Parker-Burnett House, Somerville, Massachusetts, NRHP-listed
- Edgar A. Burnett House, Lincoln, Nebraska, NRHP-listed in Lancaster County
- Southerland-Burnette House, Mount Olive, North Carolina, NRHP-listed in Wayne County
- Worsley-Burnette House, Conetoe, North Carolina, NRHP-listed in Edgecombe County
- William Burnett House, Washington Court House, Ohio, NRHP-listed in Fayette County
- Burnett House (Houston, Texas), NRHP-listed in Harris County
- Burk Burnett Building, Fort Worth, Texas, NRHP-listed in Tarrant County

== See also ==
- Burnet House
