= Frank E. and Emma A. Gillen House =

- U.S. National Register of Historic Places
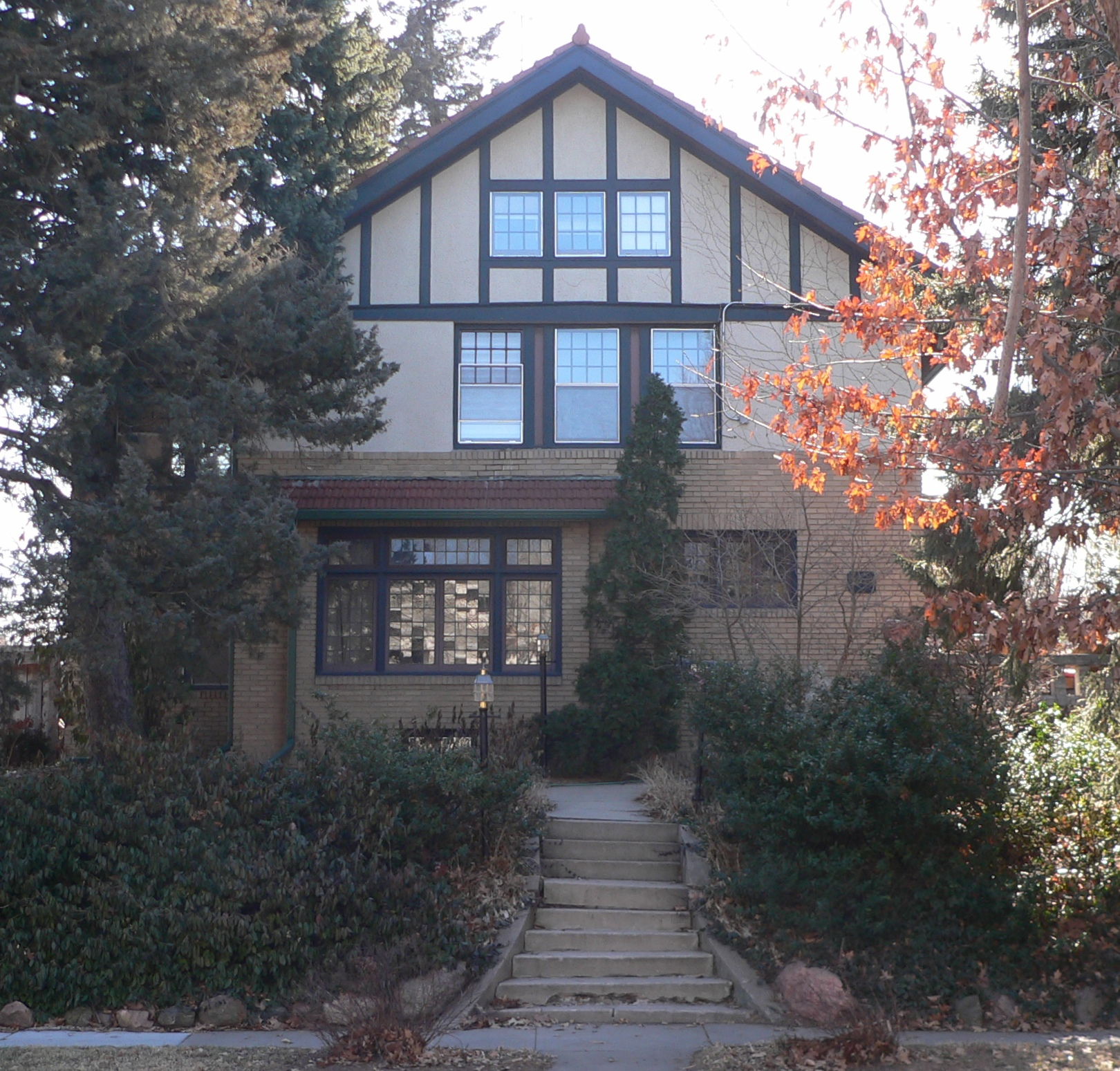
- The house in 2012

- Location within Nebraska Location within the United States
- Location: 2245 A Street, Lincoln, Nebraska
- Coordinates: 40°47′54″N 96°41′01″W
- Area: less than one acre
- Built: 1903
- Built by: A.J. Lawrence
- Architect: Ferdinand C. Fiske, Harry Meginnis
- Architectural style: Late 19th And 20th Century Revivals
- NRHP reference No.: 98000188
- Added to NRHP: March 5, 1998

The Frank E. and Emma A. Gillen House is a historic two-and-a-half-story house in Lincoln, Nebraska, United States. It was built in 1903 for Frank Gillen, the founder of the Gillen and Boney Candy Company. His wife Emma was an immigrant from Germany. The house became a designated city landmark in 1983. It has been listed on the National Register of Historic Places since March 5, 1998.
