= Hurlbut–Yates House =

- Aeneas Hurlbut–Charles Yates House
- U.S. National Register of Historic Places
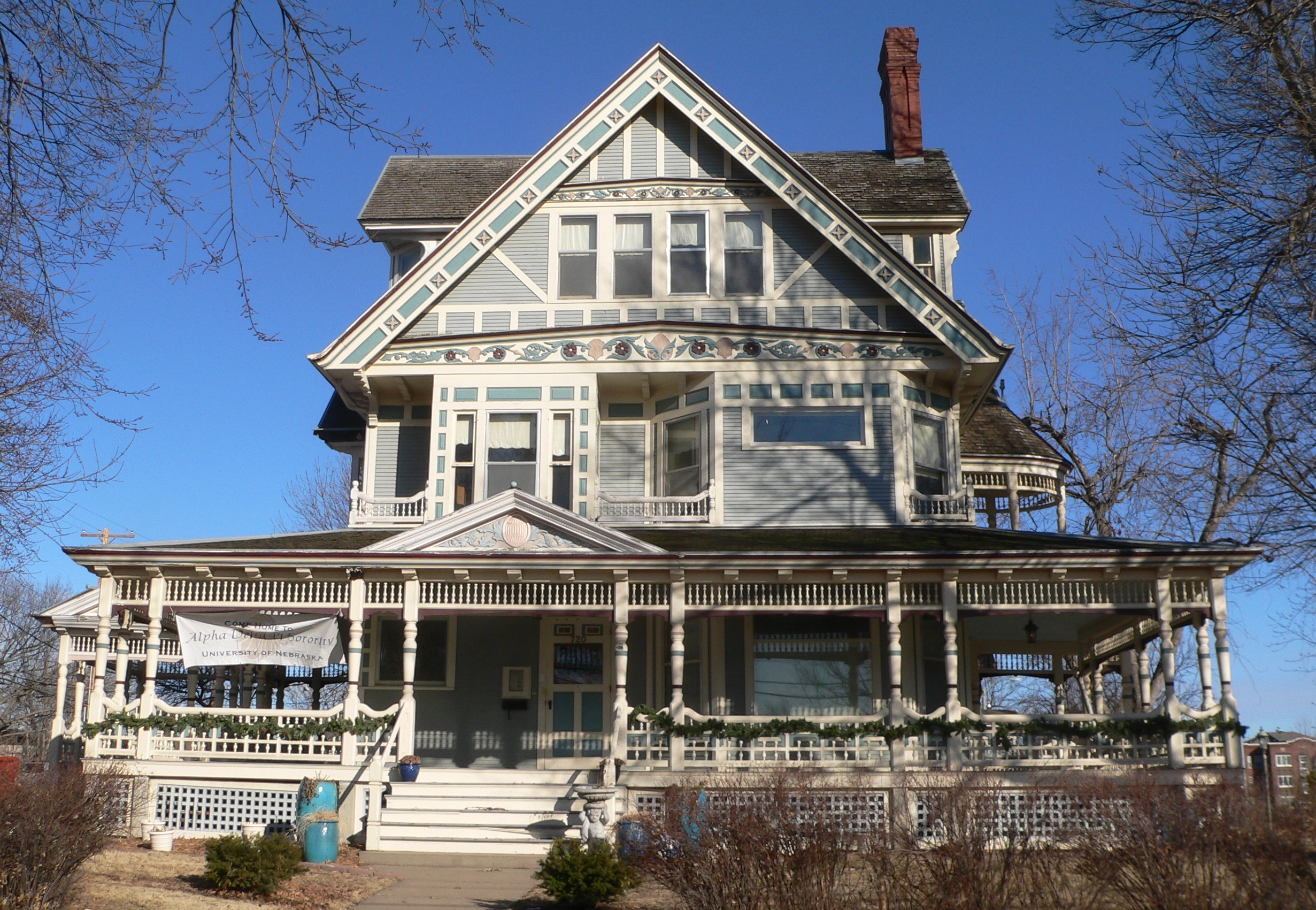
- The house in 2012

- Location within Nebraska Location within the United States
- Location: 720 South 16th Street, Lincoln, Nebraska
- Coordinates: 40°48′24″N 96°41′46″W
- Area: less than one acre
- Built: 1891
- Architect: Ferdinand C. Fiske
- Architectural style: Queen Anne, Stick/Eastlake
- NRHP reference No.: 99001167
- Added to NRHP: September 17, 1999

The Hurlbut–Yates House is a historic house in Lincoln, Nebraska. It was built in 1891 for Aeneas Hurlbut, who had served in the American Civil War of 1861–1865 before moving to Nebraska. It was designed in the Queen Anne and Stick/Eastlake styles by architect Ferdinand C. Fiske. In 1893, it was purchased by Charles Yates, who lived here with his wife Ruth, their two sons and two daughters. The house was listed on the National Register of Historic Places on September 17, 1999 as Aeneas Hurlbut–Charles Yates House. (Note: In the National Park Service's listing of the house in 1999 it was literally termed the "Hurlbut, Aeneas--Yates, Charles, House". Whereas the National Park Service's NRIS database did not accommodate en-dash or em-dash at the time, the "--" is interpreted now as intending "–". And whereas the 1999 presentation involved showing names in "lastname, firstname" order perhaps for alphabetization purposes in the database which are not necessary now, the persons' names are now interpreted in unwrapped "firstname lastname" format.)

It is termed the "Hurlbut–Yates House" by the City of Lincoln, (Note: The City of Lincoln styles the dash as a hyphen.) which designated the house to be a Local Landmark. In its 1987 Local Landmark application, the property was deemed "one of the finest Queen Anne style houses in Nebraska, with a high degree of integrity, reinforced by an exemplary rehabilitation and restoration." It also noted that "Charles Yates was a leading businessman in Lincoln and his sons and grandsons continued to make significant and positive impact on the community."
