= Barr Terrace =

- U.S. National Register of Historic Places
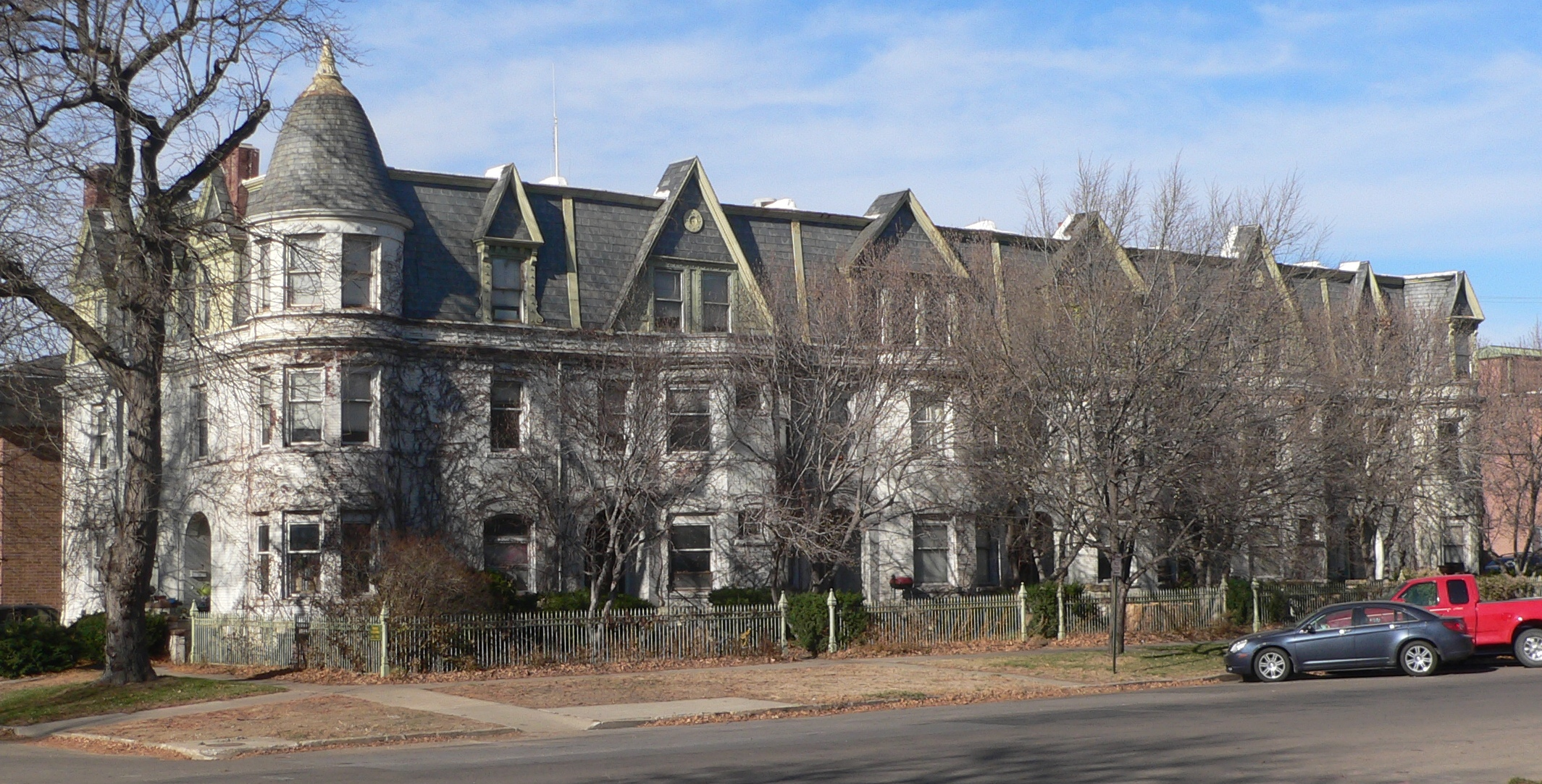
- The building in 2012

- Location within Nebraska Location within the United States
- Location: 627–643 S. 11th, and 1044 H St., Lincoln, Nebraska
- Coordinates: 40°48′25″N 96°42′20″W
- Area: less than one acre
- Built: 1890
- Architect: Ferdinand C. Fiske
- Architectural style: Châteauesque
- MPS: Nineteenth Century Terrace Houses TR
- NRHP reference No.: 79003688
- Added to NRHP: October 1, 1979

Barr Terrace is a historic three-story row house in Lincoln, Nebraska. It was built in 1890 for William Barr, a German immigrant, and designed in the Châteauesque architectural style. It has been listed on the National Register of Historic Places since October 1, 1979. It was restored in 1979–1980.

== History ==
The structure was built in 1890 for William Barr, a German immigrant and real estate investor who first settled in Lincoln in 1861, when it was still known as Lancaster. Barr also owned Lyman Terrace. Another owner was Homan J. Walsh, a real estate investor and businessman who served as a councilman.

Below the three stories, which were built with bricks, there is a basement, built with rusticated stones. The mansard roof was built with slate, and the windowsills with sandstone.

The building was designed in the Châteauesque style by architect Ferdinand C. Fiske, a Cornell-educated architect who designed many buildings in Nebraska. On the southern side of the building, there is a tourelle. An 1890 article in the Nebraska State Journal noted, "These two properties of Messrs. Barr, Barnes (Barr Terrace) and Lyman (Lyman Terrace) are the beginning of a tendency to erect fine tenement residences that will be substantial ornaments to the city."

By 1979, the building's owner was listed as James Brygger. Brygger had recently graduated from the University of Nebraska–Lincoln's School of Architecture, and he purchased the building with the help of an investor to restore it. According to a 1980 article in the Lincoln Journal Star, "Singlehandedly, he ripped, tore and pounded apart the interior, demolishing the original -- and deteriorated -- walls, floors and ceilings. The work was too much for one, so he subcontracted, adding workers to build cabinetry and assist him." Once restored, it was marketed as rentals for the middle class.

The building has been listed on the National Register of Historic Places since October 1, 1979.
