= Lyman Terrace =

- U.S. National Register of Historic Places
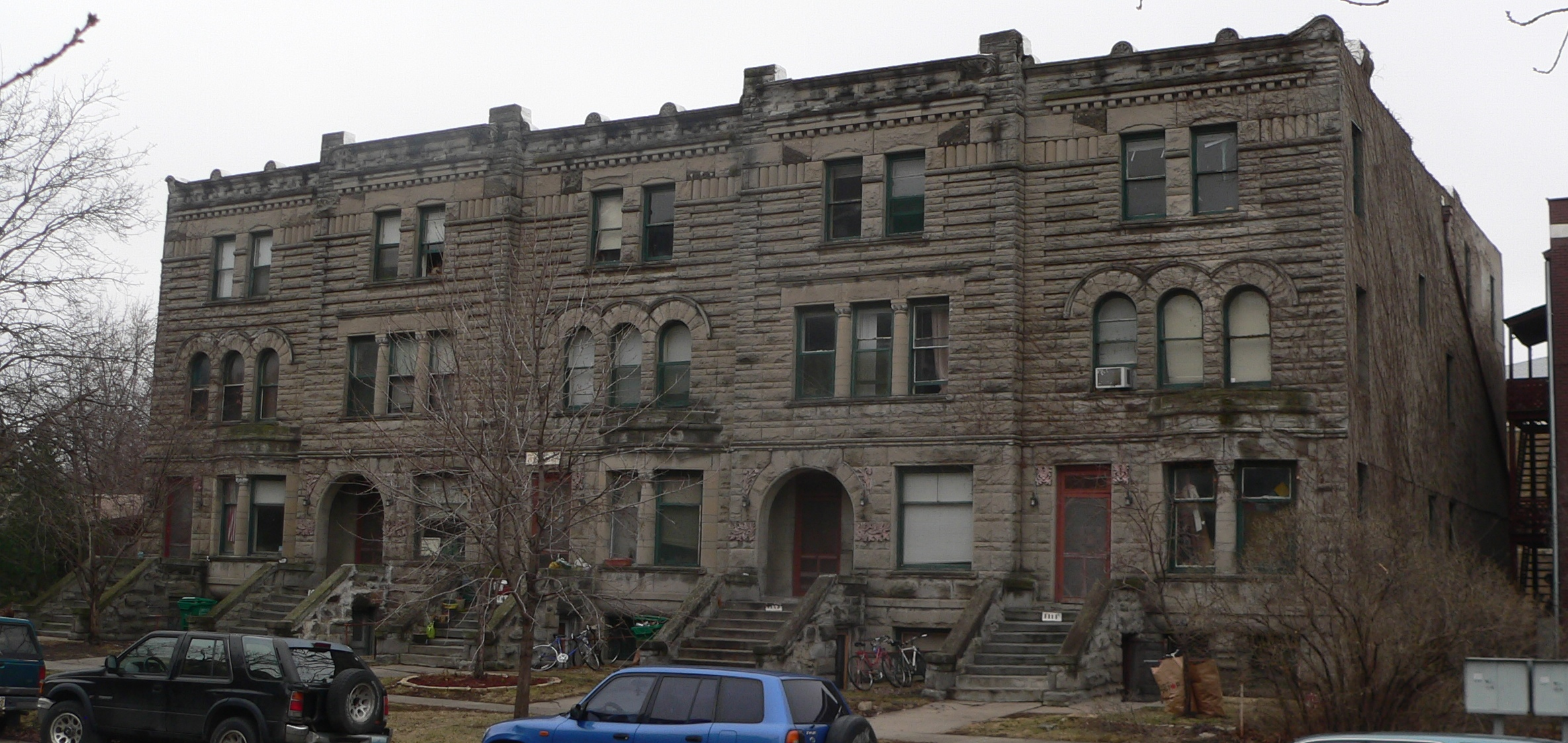
- The building in 2012

- Location within Nebraska Location within the United States
- Location: 1111--1119 H Street, Lincoln, Nebraska
- Coordinates: 40°48′25″N 96°42′17″W
- Area: less than one acre
- Built: 1889
- Architect: Ferdinand C. Fiske
- Architectural style: Eclectic
- MPS: Nineteenth Century Terrace Houses TR
- NRHP reference No.: 79003689
- Added to NRHP: October 1, 1979

The Lyman Terrace is a historic three-story apartment building in Lincoln, Nebraska. It was built in 1889 for Charles W. Lyman, and designed in the eclectic style by architect Ferdinand C. Fiske. By 1890, it belonged to William Barr, a German immigrant and real estate investor who first settled in Lincoln in 1861, when it was still known as Lancaster, and also owned Barr Terrace. The building has been listed on the National Register of Historic Places since October 1, 1979.
