= York, Nebraska =

City in and county seat of York County, Nebraska, United States

- City
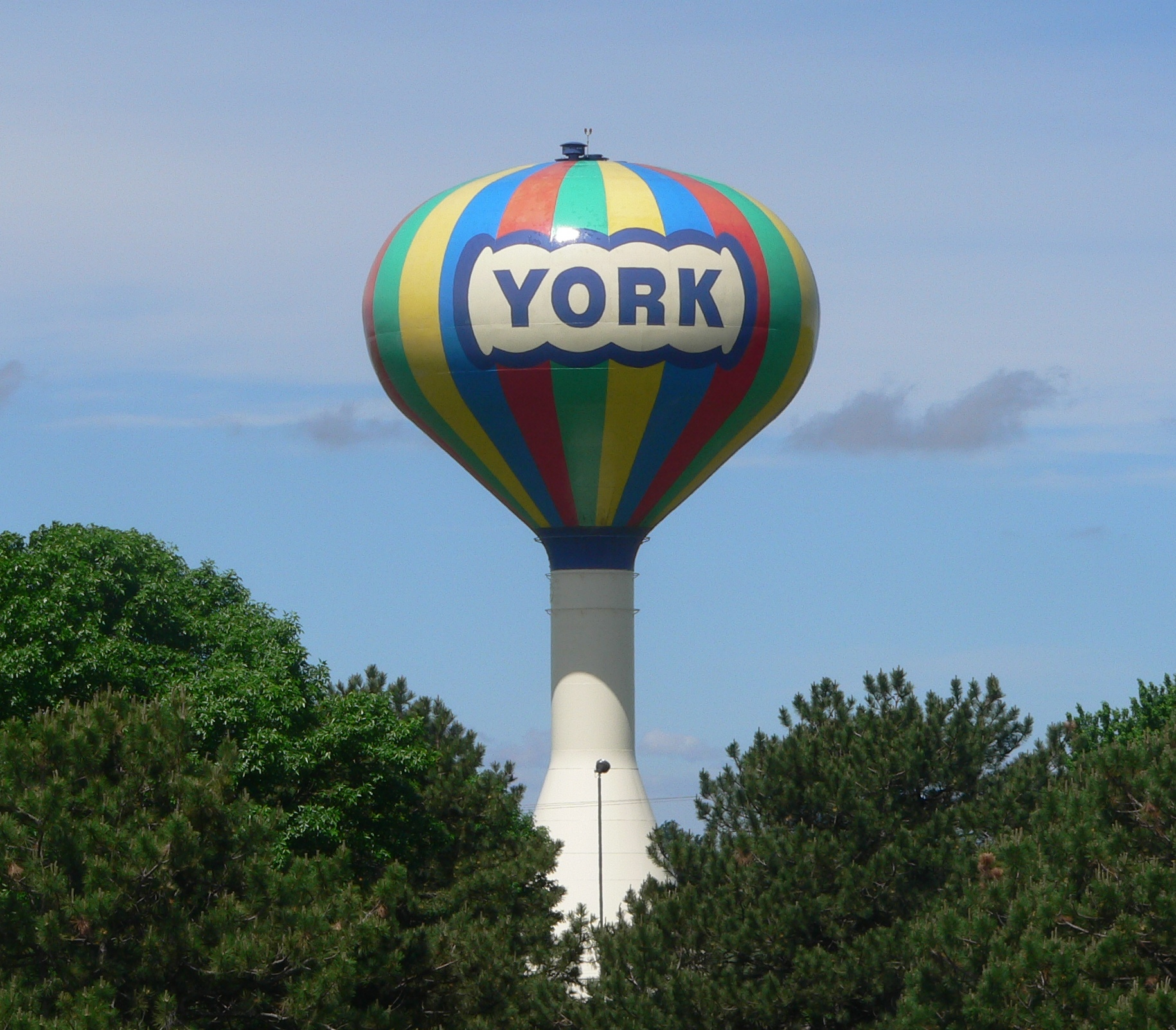
- York water tower, May 2013

- Location within York County and Nebraska
- Coordinates: 40°52′12″N 97°35′34″W
- Country: United States
- State: Nebraska
- County: York

Area
  - Total: 6.56 sq mi (16.99 km^{2})
  - Land: 6.53 sq mi (16.92 km^{2})
  - Water: 0.027 sq mi (0.07 km^{2})
- Elevation: 1,604 ft (489 m)

Population (2020)
  - Total: 8,066
  - Density: 1,235.0/sq mi (476.84/km^{2})
- Time zone: UTC−6 (Central (CST))
  - Summer (DST): UTC−5 (CDT)
- ZIP code: 68467
- Area code: 402
- FIPS code: 31-54045
- GNIS feature ID: 2397392
- Website: cityofyork.ne.gov

York is a city in and the county seat of York County, Nebraska, United States. As of the 2020 census, York had a population of 8,066. It is the home of York University and the Nebraska Correctional Center for Women.

== History ==
York was platted in 1869. The city took its name from York County.

In 1920, the Nebraska legislature established the State Reformatory for Women in York. The facility was expanded over the years; as of 2017, it operated as the Nebraska Correctional Center for Women, with a rated capacity of 275 beds.

York College opened in the town in 1890. In 2022, the college attained university status, and thus became York University.

== Demographics ==
Historical population
Census	Pop.	Note	%±
1880	1,259		—
1890	3,405		170.5%
1900	5,132		50.7%
1910	6,235		21.5%
1920	5,388		−13.6%
1930	5,712		6.0%
1940	5,383		−5.8%
1950	6,178		14.8%
1960	6,173		−0.1%
1970	6,778		9.8%
1980	7,723		13.9%
1990	7,884		2.1%
2000	8,081		2.5%
2010	7,766		−3.9%
2020	8,066		3.9%
U.S. Decennial Census; 2013 Estimate

=== 2020 census ===
As of the 2020 census, York had a population of 8,066 and a population density of 1,235.2 inhabitants per square mile (476.9/km^{2}). There were 3,348 households and 2,021 families in the city. The median age was 38.5 years. 22.7% of residents were under the age of 18 and 19.8% were 65 years of age or older. For every 100 females, there were 97.9 males, and for every 100 females age 18 and over, there were 95.8 males age 18 and over.

98.8% of residents lived in urban areas, while 1.2% lived in rural areas.

Of those households, 26.8% had children under the age of 18 living in them. Of all households, 47.0% were married-couple households, 19.9% were households with a male householder and no spouse or partner present, and 26.9% were households with a female householder and no spouse or partner present. About 35.8% of all households were made up of individuals and 16.1% had someone living alone who was 65 years of age or older. The average household size was 2.2 and the average family size was 2.9.

There were 3,769 housing units, of which 11.2% were vacant. The homeowner vacancy rate was 3.0% and the rental vacancy rate was 13.9%.

Racial composition as of the 2020 census
Race	Number	Percent
White	7,155	88.7%
Black or African American	112	1.4%
American Indian and Alaska Native	45	0.6%
Asian	77	1.0%
Native Hawaiian and Other Pacific Islander	4	0.0%
Some other race	279	3.5%
Two or more races	394	4.9%
Hispanic or Latino (of any race)	612	7.6%

=== Income and poverty ===
The 2016–2020 5-year American Community Survey estimates show that the median household income was $58,125 (with a margin of error of +/- $7,758) and the median family income $79,282 (+/- $8,729). Males had a median income of $40,700 (+/- $6,625) versus $25,183 (+/- $3,155) for females. The median income for those above 16 years old was $31,846 (+/- $6,303). Approximately, 4.5% of families and 8.9% of the population were below the poverty line, including 9.0% of those under the age of 18 and 7.9% of those ages 65 or over.

=== 2010 census ===
As of the census of 2010, there were 7,766 people, 3,253 households, and 1,992 families living in the city. The population density was 1,350.6 inhabitants per square mile (521.5/km^{2}). There were 3,633 housing units at an average density of 631.8 per square mile (243.9/km^{2}). The racial makeup of the city was 94.9% White, 1.0% African American, 0.3% Native American, 0.7% Asian, 0.1% Pacific Islander, 1.8% from other races, and 1.2% from two or more races. Hispanic or Latino of any race were 4.4% of the population.

There were 3,253 households, of which 27.4% had children under the age of 18 living with them, 49.4% were married couples living together, 8.4% had a female householder with no husband present, 3.4% had a male householder with no wife present, and 38.8% were non-families. 33.4% of all households were made up of individuals, and 15.4% had someone living alone who was 65 years of age or older. The average household size was 2.26 and the average family size was 2.87.

The median age in the city was 39.4 years. 22.9% of residents were under the age of 18; 11.3% were between the ages of 18 and 24; 21.9% were from 25 to 44; 25.7% were from 45 to 64; and 18.2% were 65 years of age or older. The gender makeup of the city was 49.0% male and 51.0% female.

=== 2000 census ===
As of the census of 2000, there were 8,081 people, 3,304 households, and 2,101 families living in the city. The population density was 1,433.6 inhabitants per square mile (553.5/km^{2}). There were 3,532 housing units at an average density of 626.6 per square mile (241.9/km^{2}). The racial makeup of the city was 96.76% White, 0.74% African American, 0.15% Native American, 0.74% Asian, 0.11% Pacific Islander, 0.58% from other races, and 0.92% from two or more races. Hispanic or Latino of any race were 1.56% of the population.

There were 3,304 households, out of which 29.0% had children under the age of 18 living with them, 53.3% were married couples living together, 7.8% had a female householder with no husband present, and 36.4% were non-families. 31.5% of all households were made up of individuals, and 16.4% had someone living alone who was 65 years of age or older. The average household size was 2.31 and the average family size was 2.90.

In the city, the population was spread out, with 23.7% under the age of 18, 11.7% from 18 to 24, 24.0% from 25 to 44, 22.4% from 45 to 64, and 18.2% who were 65 years of age or older. The median age was 38 years. For every 100 females, there were 90.1 males. For every 100 females age 18 and over, there were 86.6 males.

As of 2000 the median income for a household in the city was $36,069, and the median income for a family was $45,544. Males had a median income of $31,014 versus $20,086 for females. The per capita income for the city was $17,813. About 6.3% of families and 9.2% of the population were below the poverty line, including 9.1% of those under age 18 and 8.1% of those age 65 or over.

== Geography ==
The city sits at the crossroads of Interstate 80, a major east–west highway, and U.S. Route 81, a major north–south highway.

According to the United States Census Bureau, the city has a total area of 5.77 square miles (14.94 km^{2}), of which 5.75 square miles (14.89 km^{2}) is land and 0.02 square miles (0.05 km^{2}) is water.

=== Climate ===
According to the Köppen Climate Classification system, York has a hot-summer humid continental climate, abbreviated "Dfa" on climate maps.

Climate data for York, Nebraska, 1991–2020 normals
Month	Jan	Feb	Mar	Apr	May	Jun	Jul	Aug	Sep	Oct	Nov	Dec	Year
Mean daily maximum °F (°C)	34.9 (1.6)	39.7 (4.3)	51.8 (11.0)	63.5 (17.5)	73.3 (22.9)	83.7 (28.7)	87.1 (30.6)	85.0 (29.4)	79.2 (26.2)	66.5 (19.2)	51.6 (10.9)	38.7 (3.7)	62.9 (17.2)
Daily mean °F (°C)	23.7 (−4.6)	28.0 (−2.2)	39.1 (3.9)	49.9 (9.9)	60.9 (16.1)	71.7 (22.1)	75.5 (24.2)	73.4 (23.0)	66.1 (18.9)	52.6 (11.4)	38.8 (3.8)	27.5 (−2.5)	50.6 (10.3)
Mean daily minimum °F (°C)	12.6 (−10.8)	16.3 (−8.7)	26.3 (−3.2)	36.4 (2.4)	48.5 (9.2)	59.7 (15.4)	63.8 (17.7)	61.9 (16.6)	53.4 (11.9)	38.6 (3.7)	26.0 (−3.3)	16.3 (−8.7)	38.3 (3.5)
Average precipitation inches (mm)	0.71 (18)	0.91 (23)	1.63 (41)	2.97 (75)	4.92 (125)	4.23 (107)	3.84 (98)	3.70 (94)	2.28 (58)	2.45 (62)	1.40 (36)	1.15 (29)	30.19 (766)
Average snowfall inches (cm)	4.9 (12)	9.1 (23)	3.9 (9.9)	1.1 (2.8)	0.0 (0.0)	0.0 (0.0)	0.0 (0.0)	0.0 (0.0)	0.0 (0.0)	0.5 (1.3)	1.6 (4.1)	6.7 (17)	27.8 (70.1)
Average precipitation days (≥ 0.01 in)	6.1	6.5	8.4	10.7	13.5	11.4	10.1	10.9	8.4	8.4	4.5	6.6	105.5
Average snowy days (≥ 0.1 in)	4.0	5.2	2.2	0.7	0.0	0.0	0.0	0.0	0.0	0.2	1.1	3.8	17.2
Source: NOAA

== Culture ==
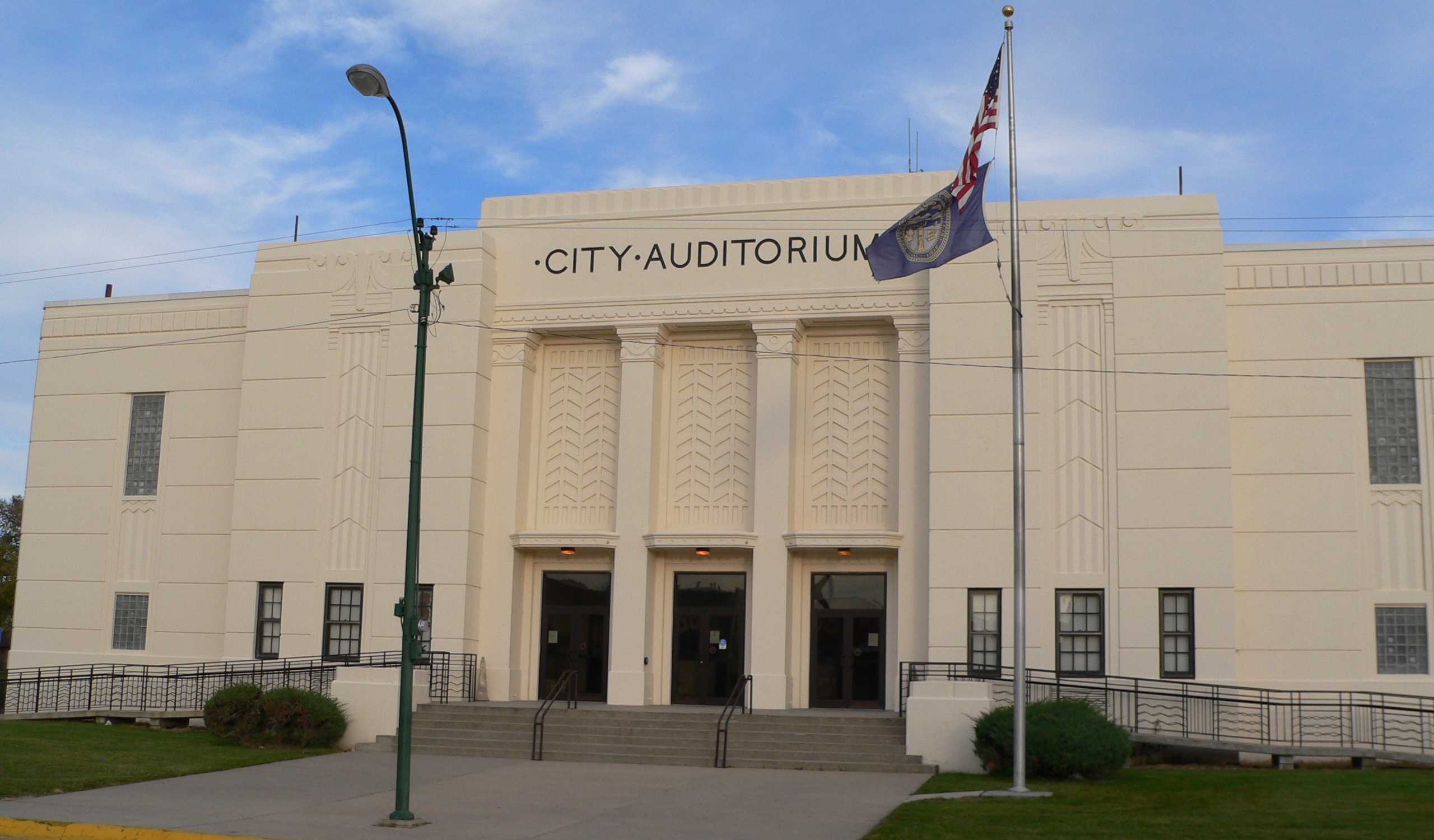
City Auditorium, October 2009

The Art Deco York Auditorium (1940) was designed by Meginnis and Schaumberg.

In 2001 Lee's Legendary Marbles and Collectables was established and as of 2023 is recognized as the World's Largest Collection of Marbles.

== Education ==
The municipality is within the York Public Schools School District. Schools in the district include York Elementary School, York Middle School and York High School.

York has two parochial schools. Emmanuel-Faith Lutheran School opened in 1957. The pre-school is located at Faith Lutheran Church in York, while grades K–8 are located in a school attached to Emmanuel Lutheran Church. St. Joseph Catholic School, opened in 1890, educates children grades PK-8.

York University is a private college affiliated with the Churches of Christ and located in York. It was founded in 1890.

== Media ==
York fielded a number of newspapers in the 1800s. On January 1, 1883, the York Democrat was created from a previous paper, the York Tribune. The York Republican was another newspaper that flourished during this time and was notable for its large circulation. York's current newspaper is the York News-Times.

York has two radio stations that have been locally owned since they went on the air in 1954: KAWL (AM 1370) and KTMX (FM 1970), providing news, sports, music and entertainment to York and adjacent counties.

== Notable people ==
- Doug Bereuter - U.S. Representative from Nebraska, 1979–2004
- David Erb - jockey, won 1956 Kentucky Derby and Belmont Stakes
- Catherine Fenselau - educator
- Loyd Jones (1912–1954) - inventor, Head of Physics for Eastman Kodak Company, Rochester, New York
- Sam Koch - NFL punter for the Baltimore Ravens
- Logan Lynn - musician, television personality and LGBT activist
- Fred Niblo - silent era film director
- Shirley Ross (born Bernice M. Gaunt) - singer, actor
- Tom Sieckmann - professional golfer

== See also ==
- List of municipalities in Nebraska
