= Wilkinson-Dozier House =

Historic house in North Carolina, United States

- U.S. National Register of Historic Places
- Location within North Carolina Location within the United States
- Location: SE of Tarboro off SR 1524, near Conetoe, North Carolina
- Coordinates: 35°51′52″N 77°26′13″W
- Area: 2 acres (0.81 ha)
- Built: 1815
- Architectural style: Federal, Federal vernacular
- NRHP reference No.: 74001348
- Added to NRHP: October 23, 1974

Wilkinson-Dozier House is a historic plantation house located near Conetoe, Edgecombe County, North Carolina. It was built about 1815, and is a two-story, three bay by two bay, Federal style frame dwelling. The front facade features a tall, rather delicate double portico with a Chinese Chippendale balustrade.

It was listed on the National Register of Historic Places in 1974.
