= Lee's Legendary Marbles and Collectables =

Art museum in York, Nebraska, US

Coordinates: 40.8327°N 97.5984°W

Lee's Legendary Marbles & Collectables
- Established: 2001
- Location: York, Nebraska
- Type: Art, Collectables, and Antique museum
- Founder: Lee Batterton

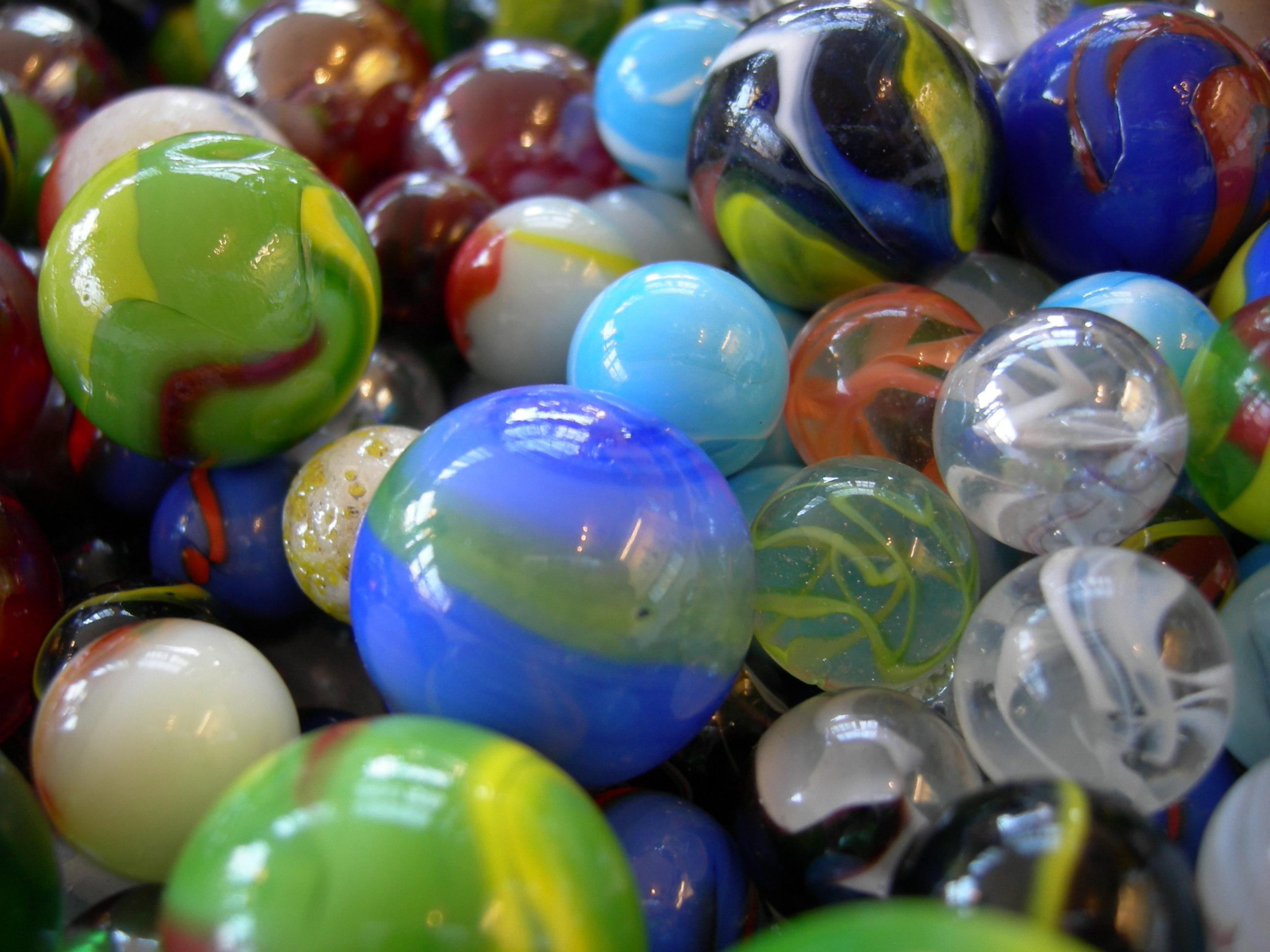
Glass Toy Marbles

Lee's Legendary Marbles and Collectables is a museum in York, Nebraska. The museum specializes in displaying, storing and sometimes selling parts of a toy marble collection Lee Batterton amassed over 70 years. In 2023, it was officially recognized as the World's Largest Collection of Marbles.

== History ==
The museum was founded in 2001 by Lee Batterton, who began collecting marbles in 1954 in the United States and later continued while living in Germany. He was raised in Oklahoma where his collection began, but moved to Germany for his work as a grain elevator repairman. Germany was the first country to create a way of mass-producing marbles, so German marbles are sought after by collectors. Marble production in America began in Akron, Ohio, in 1884, and became mass-produced in the same place in 1900 with the help of Samuel Dyke. Collecting marbles continued to rise in popularity throughout America after the turn of the 20th century. An article written in 1936 about marbles in America mentions the popularity among children of collecting them, an early documentation of the practice.

Lee was born on April 18, 1933, and died on March 8, 2024, in York, Nebraska. He created the museum on recommendation of a fellow marble-collecting friend in 2001.

== Collection ==
Lee's varied collection of marbles has been recognized as the World's Largest Collection of Marbles by the World Record Academy, consisting of over 700,000 marbles. Many of the marbles housed in the museum are kept in display cases, but Lee claims that when he began collecting marbles he would store them in jars. Many of the less valuable marbles are still kept in large glass jars at the museum today.
