= Haymarket District (Lincoln, Nebraska) =

Historic district in Lincoln, Nebraska, United States

- Neighborhood
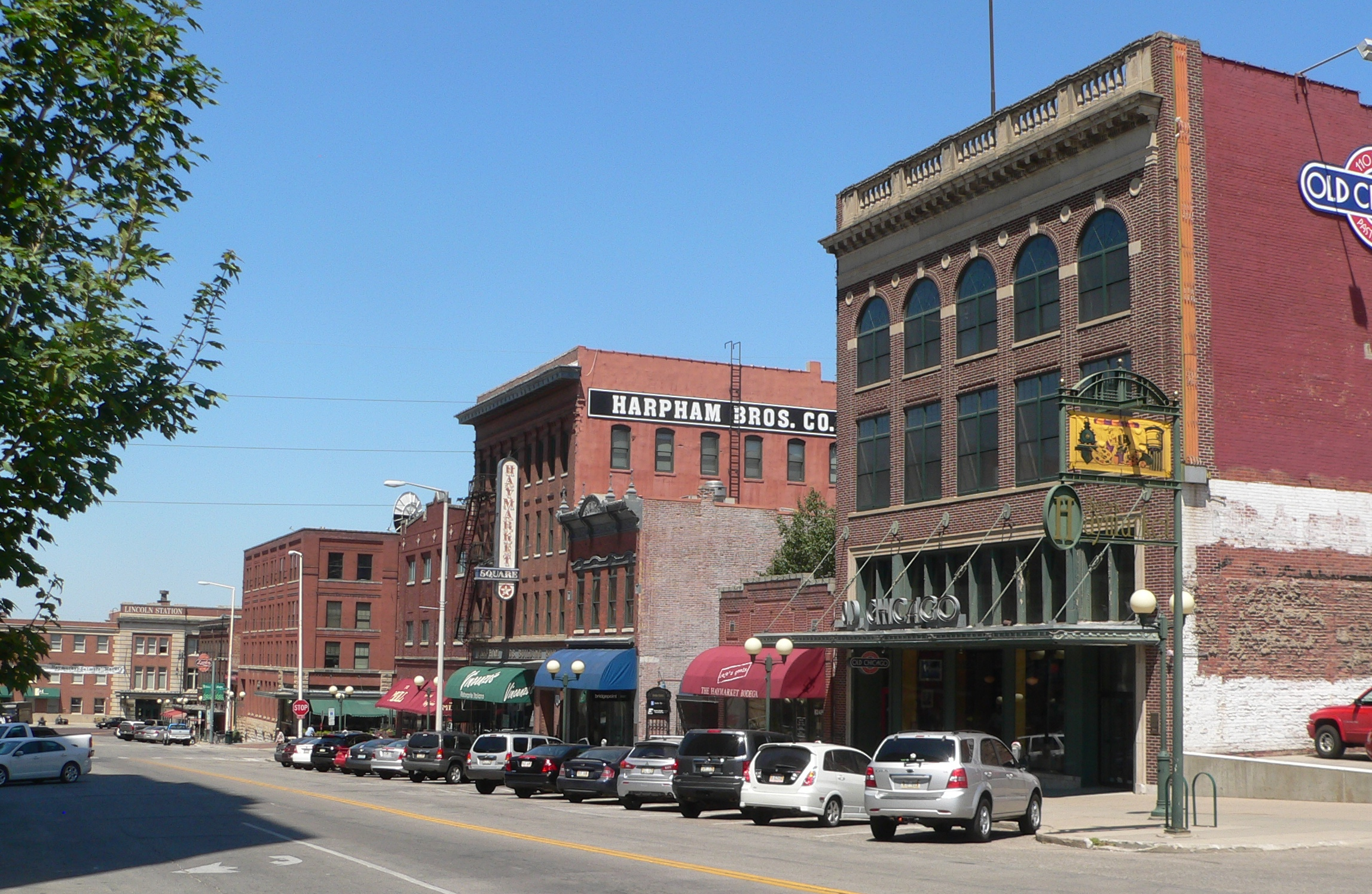
- View of some Haymarket District buildings
- Interactive map of Haymarket District
- Coordinates: 40°48′59.8″N 96°42′37.1″W
- Country: United States
- State: Nebraska
- County: Lancaster
- City: Lincoln
- Time zone: UTC-6 (Central (CST))
  - Summer (DST): UTC-5 (CDT)
- ZIP Code: 68508
- Area code: 402
- Website: lincolnhaymarket.org
- Lincoln Haymarket Historic District
- U.S. National Register of Historic Places
- U.S. Historic district
- Location: Generally 7th to 9th and N to R Sts.
- NRHP reference No.: 14000288
- Added to NRHP: July 8, 2014

Haymarket District is a neighborhood and historic district of Downtown Lincoln, Nebraska, United States. The district was created in 1874 and was originally known as Haymarket Square. The district was made landmark in 1982. Renovation projects began in the early 1980s and were completed by 1985. In 2014, the Haymarket District was officially listed on the National Register of Historic Places.

== History ==
The Haymarket District was originally known as Haymarket Square, which was created in 1874 after the city donated the previous Market Square to develop a post office and court house. The Haymaket District was largely developed from 1880 to 1920 and was used for wholesale and manufacturing. In 1895, a fire destroyed one of the Haymarket buildings.

In 1982, the Haymarket District was officially made a city landmark. Later that same year, it was announced that many of the buildings in the district would be renovated using tax-credits. The city later had to apply for a grant to help complete renovations. Renovations were completed in 1984.

Haymarket Park, a baseball field located in the district, began construction in 2000 and opened in 2002. A pedestrian bridge was built between the two to help improve traffic. In 2004, plans were announced to build an arena in the district. The arena, later named Pinnacle Bank Arena, began construction in 2011 and the arena opened in 2013.

In December 2013, it was announced that the Lincoln Historic Preservation Commission approved the district for listing on the National Register of Historic Places. The Haymarket District was officially listed on the NRHP in July 2014.

In October 2022, a 22-story high-rise building was announced for the district, known as 9 Lincoln Park. If completed, the building would become the second tallest building in Lincoln. The building was put on hold in April 2024 and currently remains as greenspace. In 2024, a $25 million park, known as South Haymarket Park, was announced for the district. The park will be 8.5 acres (34,000 m^{2}) large and will be the new location of the skatepark. It is expected to be completed in 2026.

== Architecture ==
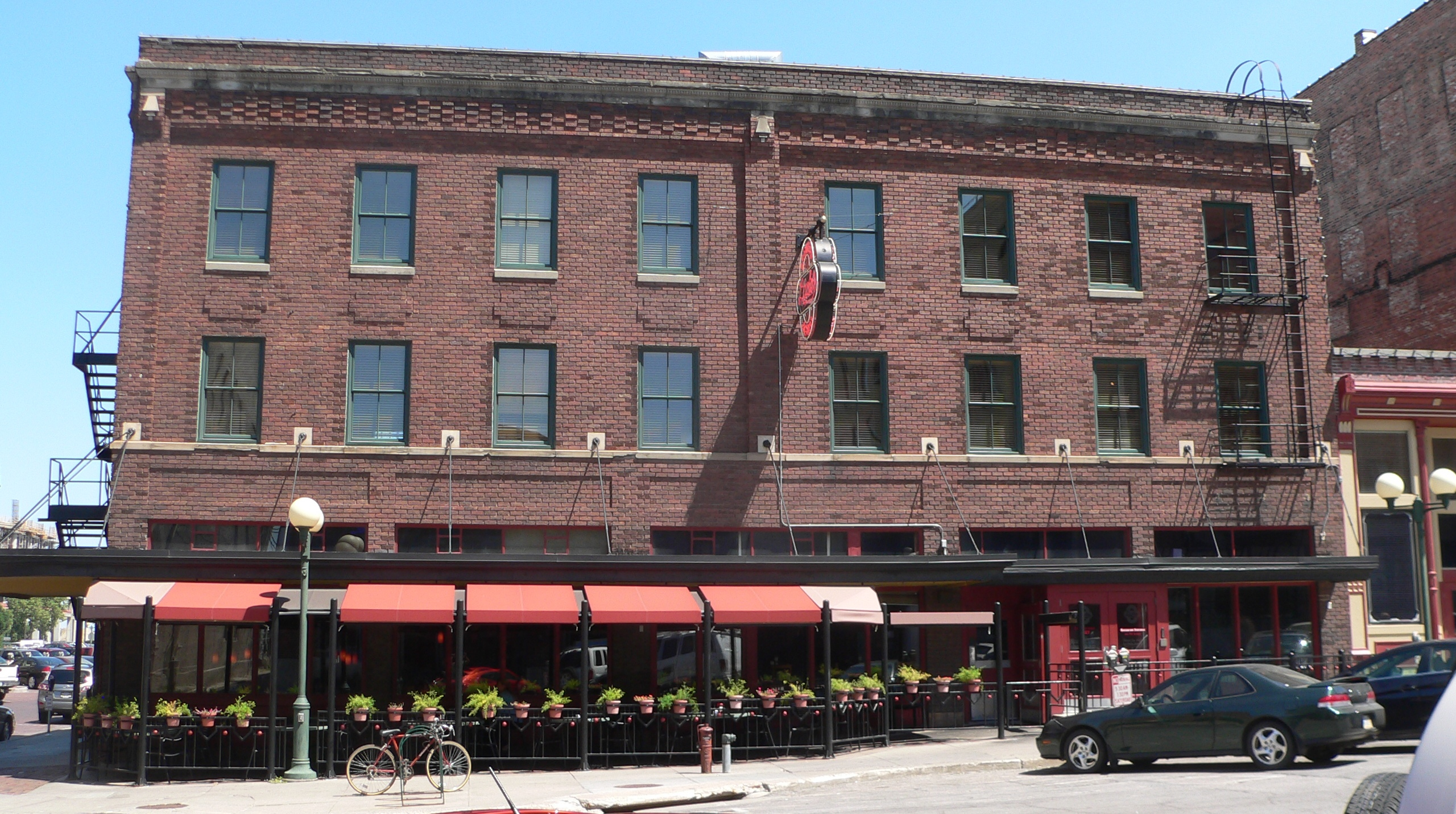
Lazlo's Brewery & Grill, 2012

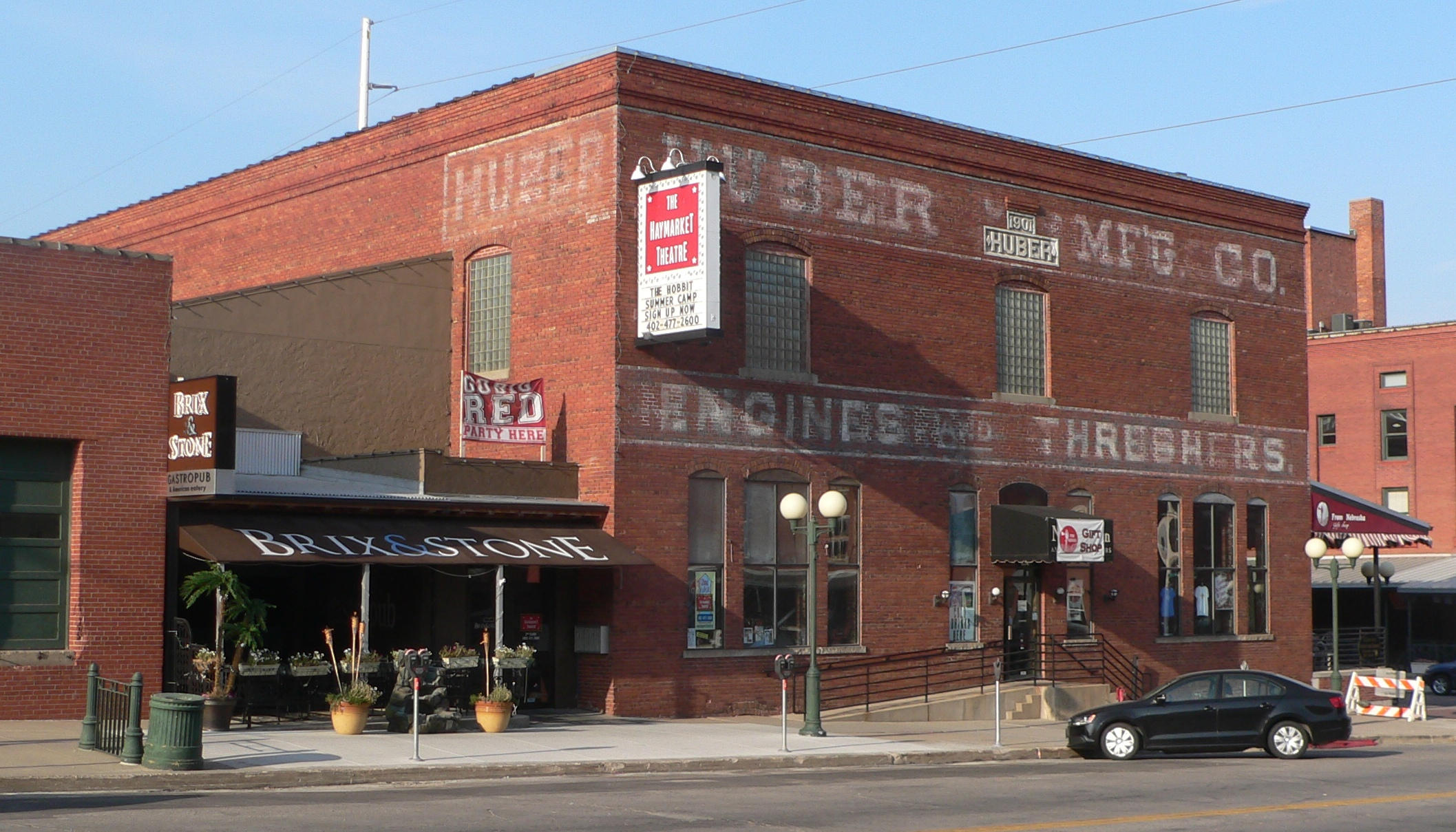
Brix & Stone (left) and the Huber Manufacturing Company building

Buildings in the district were designed by various firms including Fiske & Meginnis and Meginnis and Schaumberg. The historic J. C. Ridnour Building (1925) designed by Meginnis and Schaumberg is in the district.

== Gallery ==
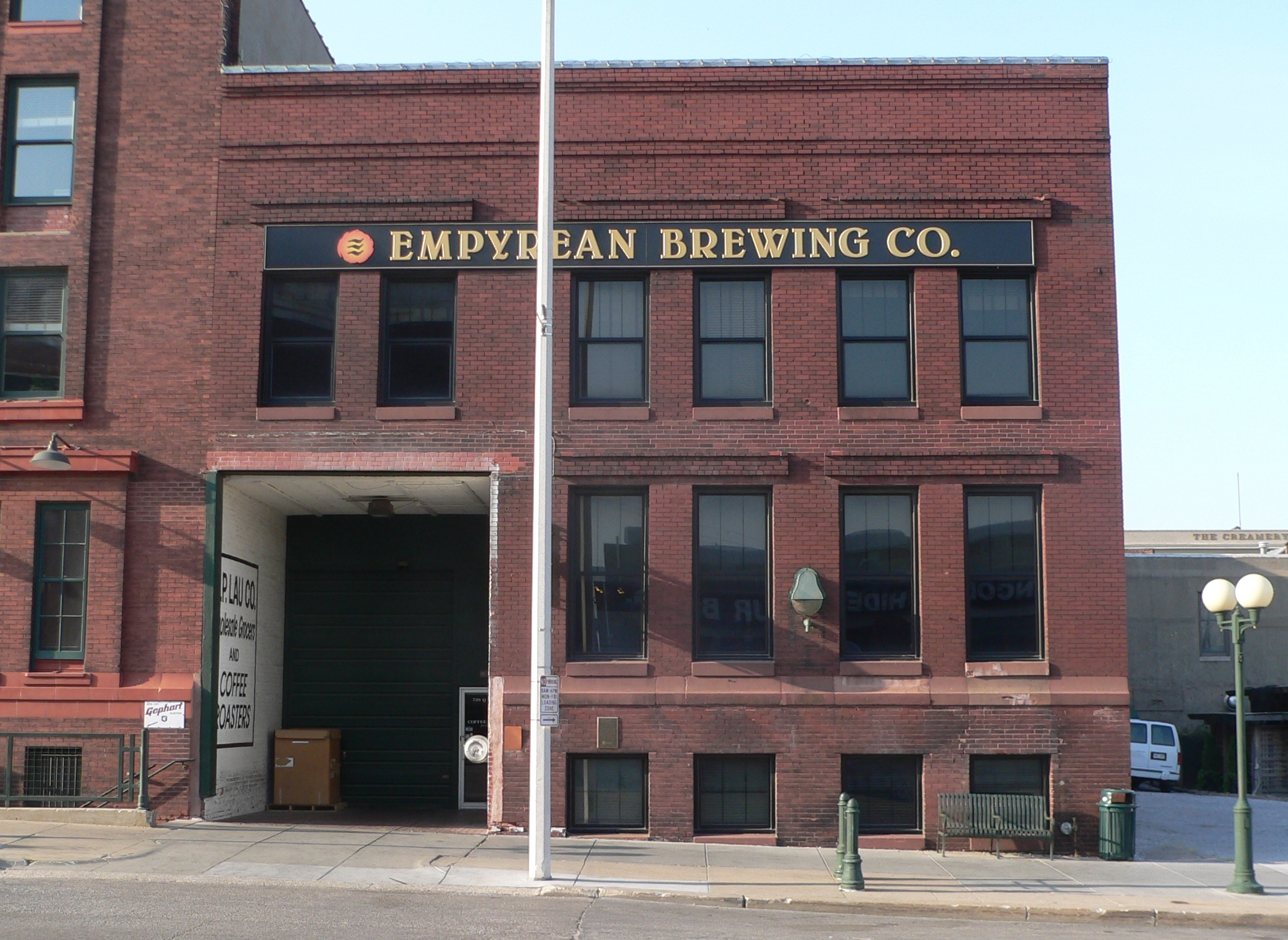
Lau building

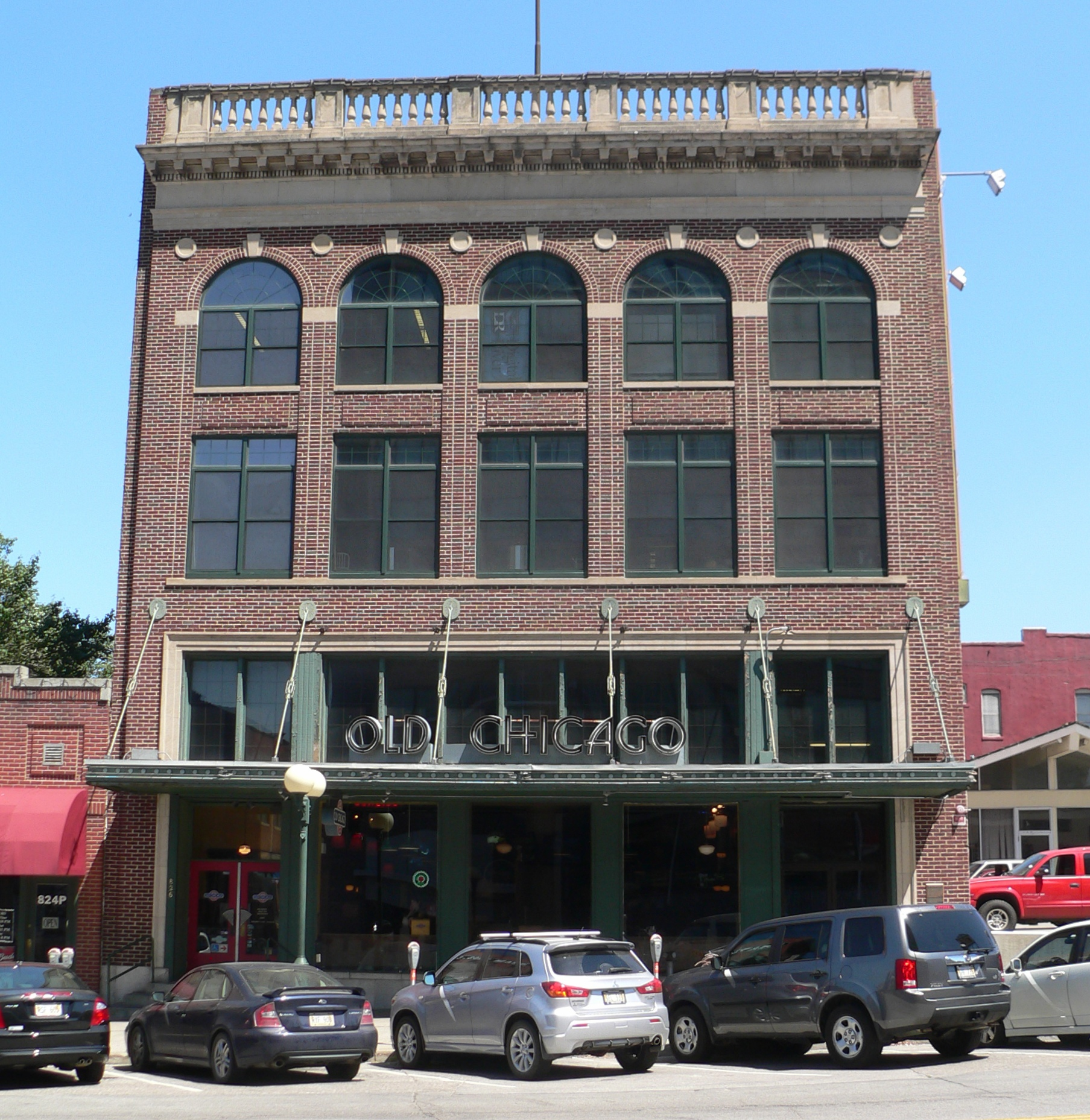
Lincoln Fixture building

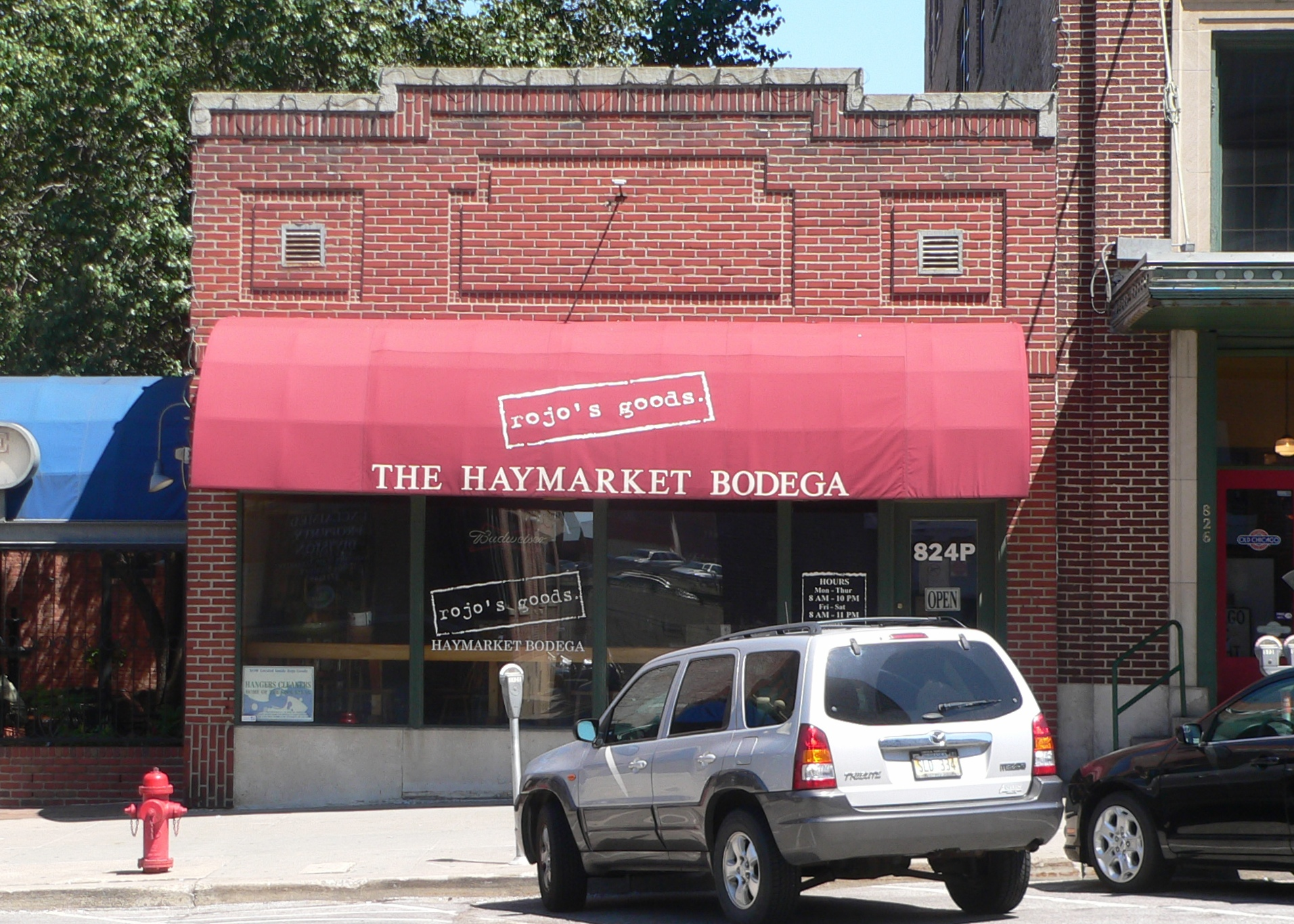
Haymarket Bodega, 824 P Street

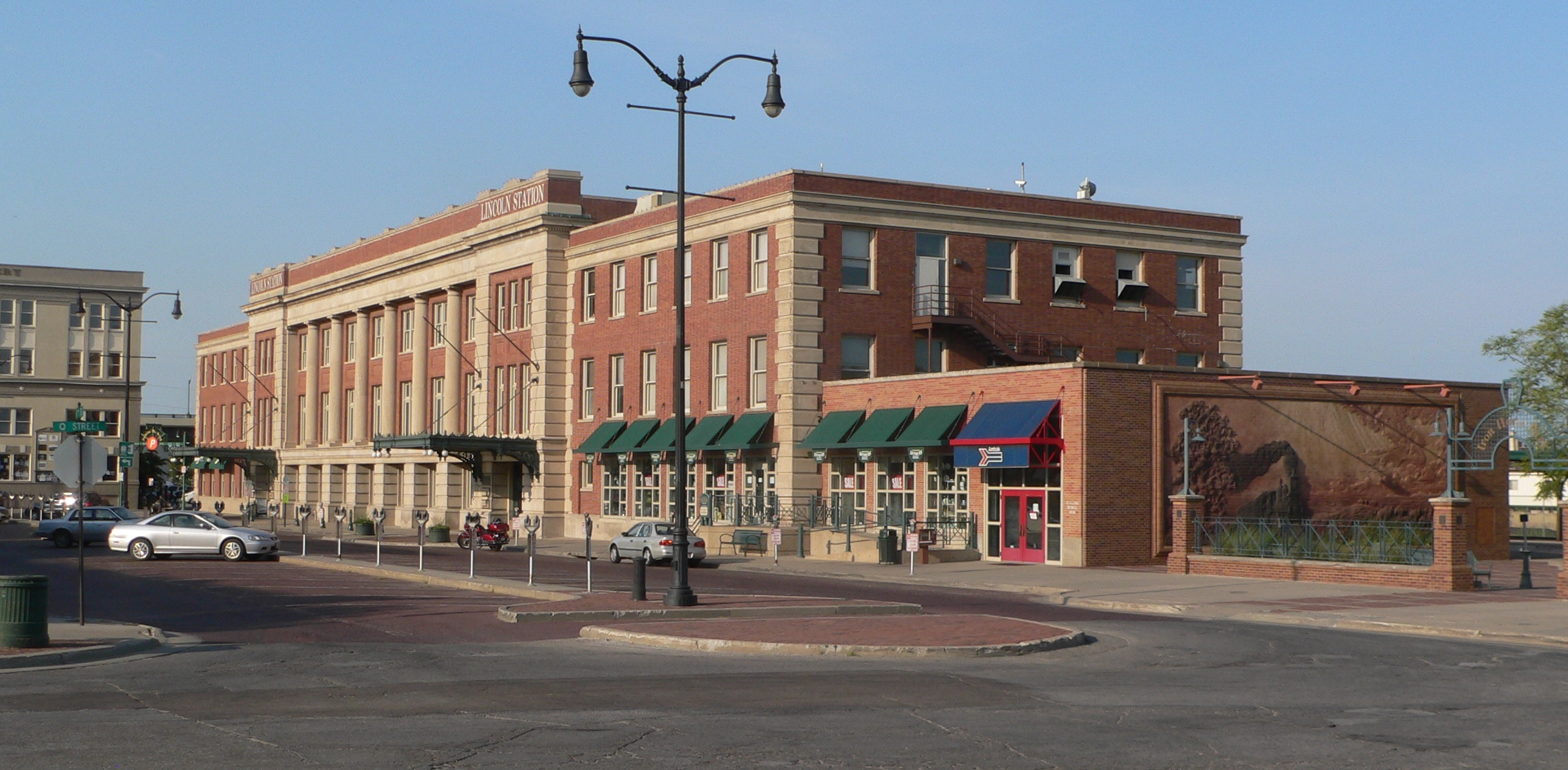
Lincoln Station

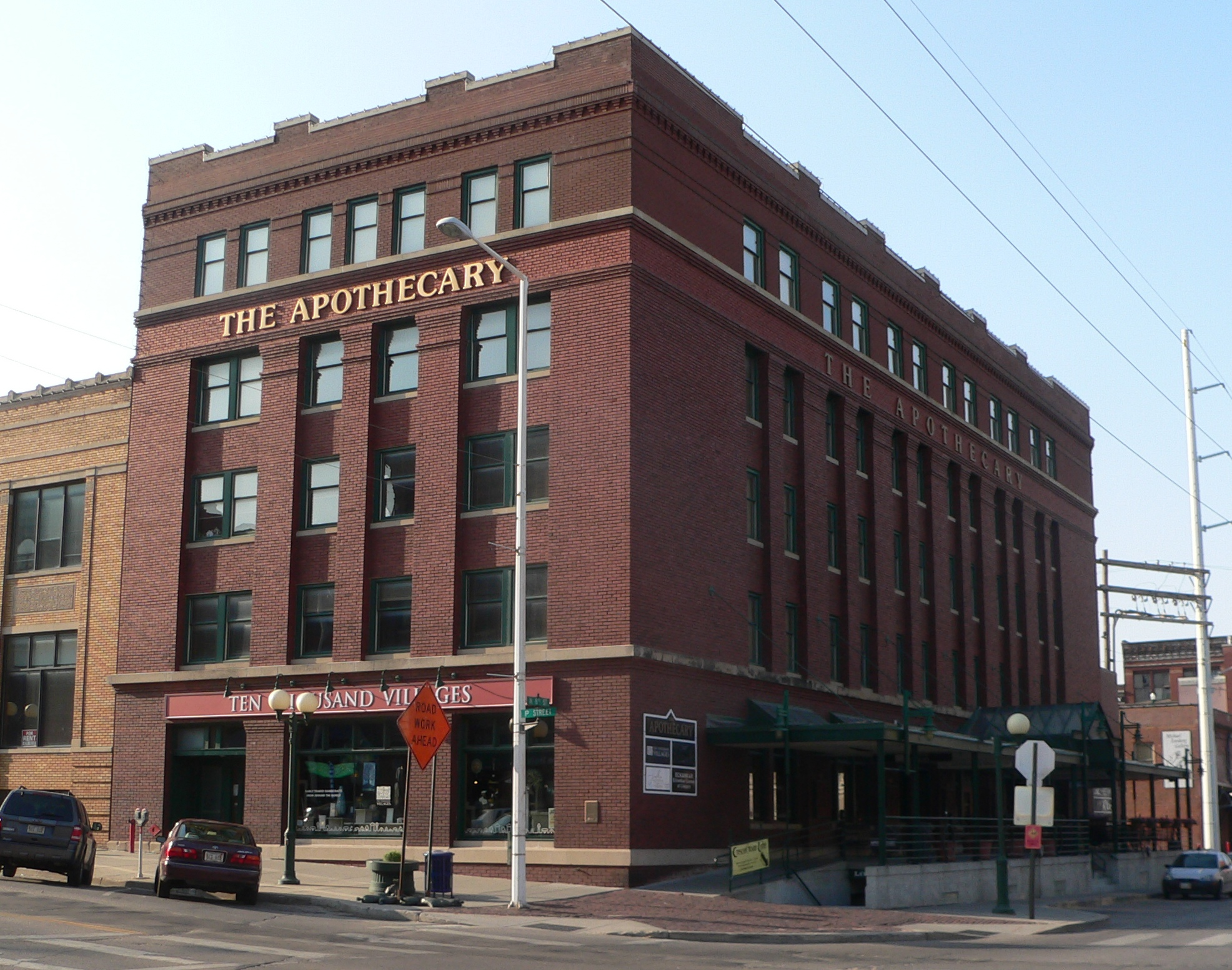
Lincoln Drug Co. building

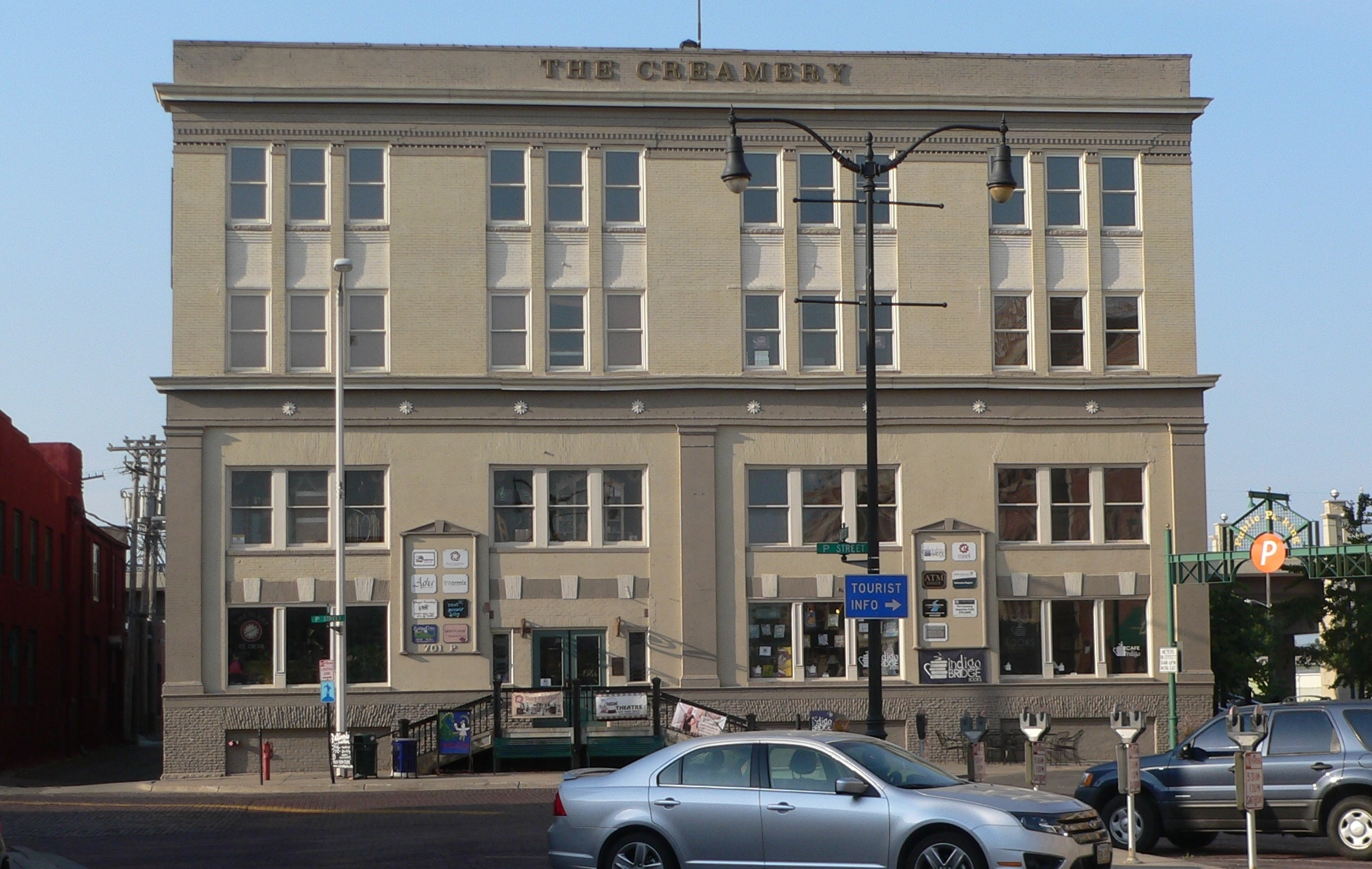
Beatrice Creamery building

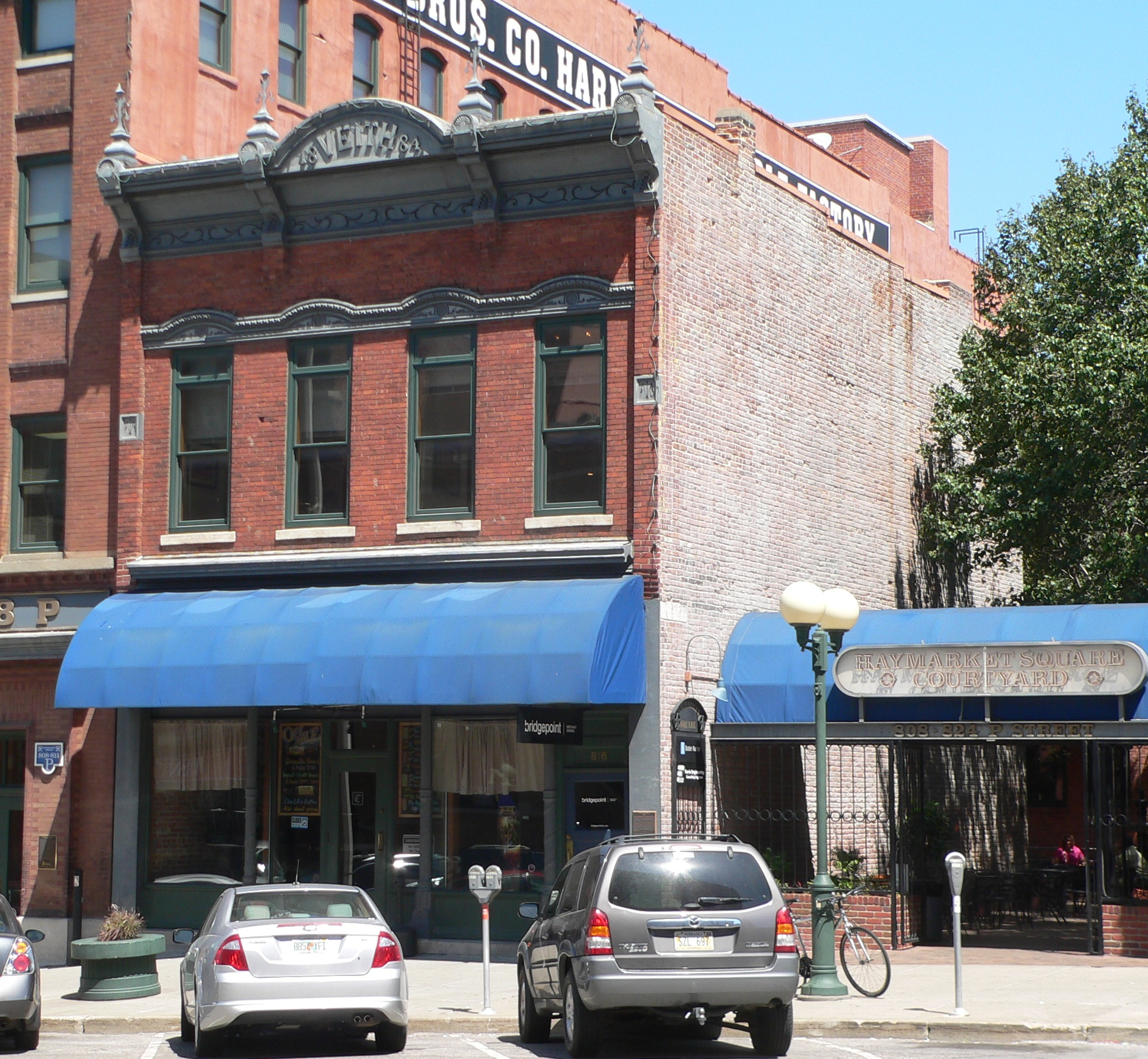
Veith Building (1884)

== See also ==
- Neighborhoods in Lincoln, Nebraska
