= Conetoe, North Carolina =

- Town
- Location in Edgecombe County and the state of North Carolina.
- Coordinates: 35°49′04″N 77°27′26″W
- Country: United States
- State: North Carolina
- County: Edgecombe
- Incorporated: 1887
- Named for: Conetoe Creek

Area
  - Total: 0.34 sq mi (0.89 km^{2})
  - Land: 0.34 sq mi (0.89 km^{2})
  - Water: 0 sq mi (0.00 km^{2})
- Elevation: 46 ft (14 m)

Population (2020)
  - Total: 198
  - Density: 577.1/sq mi (222.82/km^{2})
- Time zone: UTC-5 (Eastern (EST))
  - Summer (DST): UTC-4 (EDT)
- ZIP code: 27819
- Area code: 252
- FIPS code: 37-14200
- GNIS feature ID: 2406305
- Website: https://www.conetoe-nc.com/

Conetoe (/kəˈniːtə/ kə-NEE-tə) is a town in Edgecombe County, North Carolina, United States. It is part of the Rocky Mount, North Carolina Metropolitan Statistical Area. As of the 2020 census, Conetoe had a population of 198.

== History ==
Conetoe was founded in 1887 as Warren Station before being renamed to Conetoe after the nearby Conetoe Creek.

The Wilkinson-Dozier House and Worsley-Burnette House are listed on the National Register of Historic Places.

== Geography ==
According to the United States Census Bureau, the town has a total area of 0.4 square miles (1.0 km^{2}), all land.

== Demographics ==
Historical population
Census	Pop.	Note	%±
1890	88		—
1900	132		50.0%
1910	158		19.7%
1920	160		1.3%
1930	196		22.5%
1940	194		−1.0%
1950	172		−11.3%
1960	147		−14.5%
1970	160		8.8%
1980	215		34.4%
1990	292		35.8%
2000	365		25.0%
2010	294		−19.5%
2020	198		−32.7%
U.S. Decennial Census

=== Racial and ethnic composition ===
Conetoe town, North Carolina – Racial and ethnic composition Note: the US Census treats Hispanic/Latino as an ethnic category. This table excludes Latinos from the racial categories and assigns them to a separate category. Hispanics/Latinos may be of any race.
Race / Ethnicity (NH = Non-Hispanic)	Pop 2000	Pop 2010	Pop 2020	% 2000	% 2010	% 2020
White alone (NH)	111	62	59	30.41%	21.09%	29.80%
Black or African American alone (NH)	232	223	131	63.56%	75.85%	66.16%
Native American or Alaska Native alone (NH)	2	0	0	0.55%	0.00%	0.00%
Asian alone (NH)	0	0	0	0.00%	0.00%	0.00%
Native Hawaiian or Pacific Islander alone (NH)	0	0	0	0.00%	0.00%	0.00%
Other race alone (NH)	0	0	0	0.00%	0.00%	0.00%
Mixed race or Multiracial (NH)	0	4	3	0.00%	1.36%	1.52%
Hispanic or Latino (any race)	20	5	5	5.48%	1.70%	2.53%
Total	365	294	198	100.00%	100.00%	100.00%

=== 2000 census ===
As of the census of 2000, there were 365 people, 125 households, and 90 families residing in the town. The population density was 996.4 inhabitants per square mile (384.7/km^{2}). There were 139 housing units at an average density of 379.5 per square mile (146.5/km^{2}). The racial makeup of the town was 35.07% White, 63.56% African American and 1.37% Native American. Hispanic or Latino of any race were 5.48% of the population.

There were 125 households, out of which 30.4% had children under the age of 18 living with them, 48.0% were married couples living together, 18.4% had a female householder with no husband present, and 28.0% were non-families. 24.0% of all households were made up of individuals, and 13.6% had someone living alone who was 65 years of age or older. The average household size was 2.92 and the average family size was 3.47.

In the town, the population was spread out, with 28.8% under the age of 18, 7.9% from 18 to 24, 25.8% from 25 to 44, 23.6% from 45 to 64, and 14.0% who were 65 years of age or older. The median age was 38 years. For every 100 females, there were 85.3 males. For every 100 females age 18 and over, there were 89.8 males.

The median income for a household in the town was $35,227, and the median income for a family was $36,932. Males had a median income of $28,125 versus $24,688 for females. The per capita income for the town was $14,774. About 11.7% of families and 11.8% of the population were below the poverty line, including 12.8% of those under age 18 and 23.3% of those age 65 or over.
