= Edgar A. Burnett House =

- U.S. National Register of Historic Places
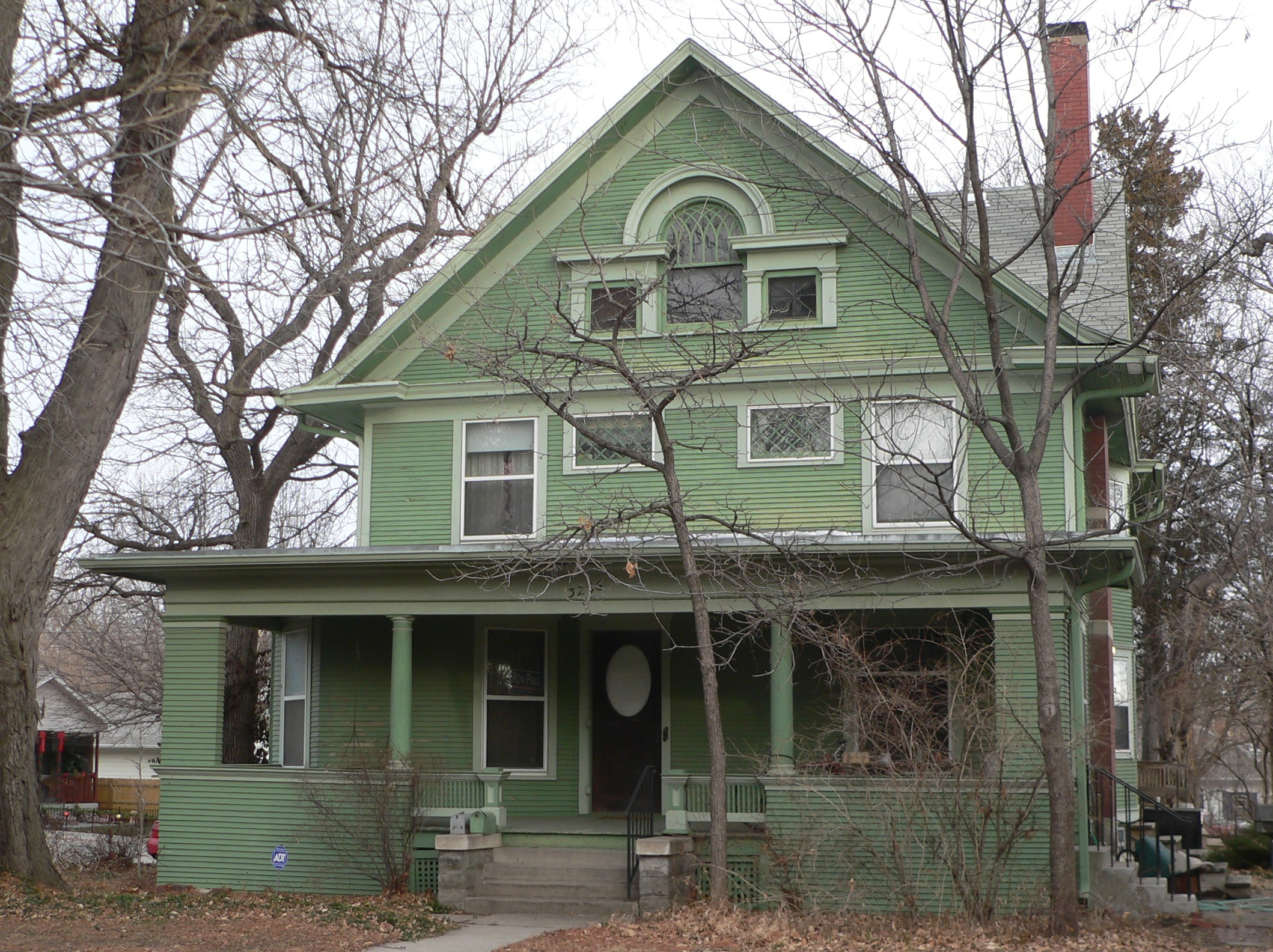
- The house in 2012

- Location within Nebraska Location within the United States
- Location: 3256 Holdredge Street; Lincoln, Nebraska
- Coordinates: 40°49′42″N 96°40′27″W
- Area: Less than one acre
- Built: 1904
- Architect: Fiske and Dieman
- Architectural style: American Foursquare
- NRHP reference No.: 06000609
- Added to NRHP: July 12, 2006

The Edgar A. Burnett House is a historic building in Lincoln, Nebraska. It was built in 1904 for University of Nebraska administrator Edgar A. Burnett, who served as chancellor of the university from 1928 to 1938. It was designed in the American Foursquare style by Fiske and Dieman and was added to the National Register of Historic Places in 2006.

== History ==
Edgar A. Burnett served the University of Nebraska in several administrative roles at the beginning of the twentieth century, becoming involved in the Agricultural College as early as 1899. He purchased a lot just southwest of the school's Farm Campus (now East Campus) in 1902 and constructed a two-and-a-half-story house on the property in 1904. The structure, designed by Ferdinand Fiske of Lincoln-based firm Fiske and Meginnis, is an example of American Foursquare (or "Prairie Box") architecture, featuring a full-width porch, boxy visual elements, and a prominent south-facing facade. A detached garage was constructed in 1926.

Burnett worked at the University of Nebraska for decades after constructing his house, becoming chancellor in August 1928. He retired in 1938 at age seventy-three after a tenure plagued by economic and political turmoil at the university, state, and national levels, and died in 1943. Burnett Hall, completed in 1948, was named for the former chancellor but is otherwise unrelated to the Edgar A. Burnett House.

The structure is on a lot slightly larger than one-half of an acre on the corner of present-day Holdredge and Grace Streets and has been minimally modified since its completion in 1904. The house was added to the National Register of Historic Places on July 12, 2006 due to its local significance in terms of architecture and Burnett's contributions to education in the University of Nebraska's formative decades.
