= Antelope Grocery =

- U.S. National Register of Historic Places
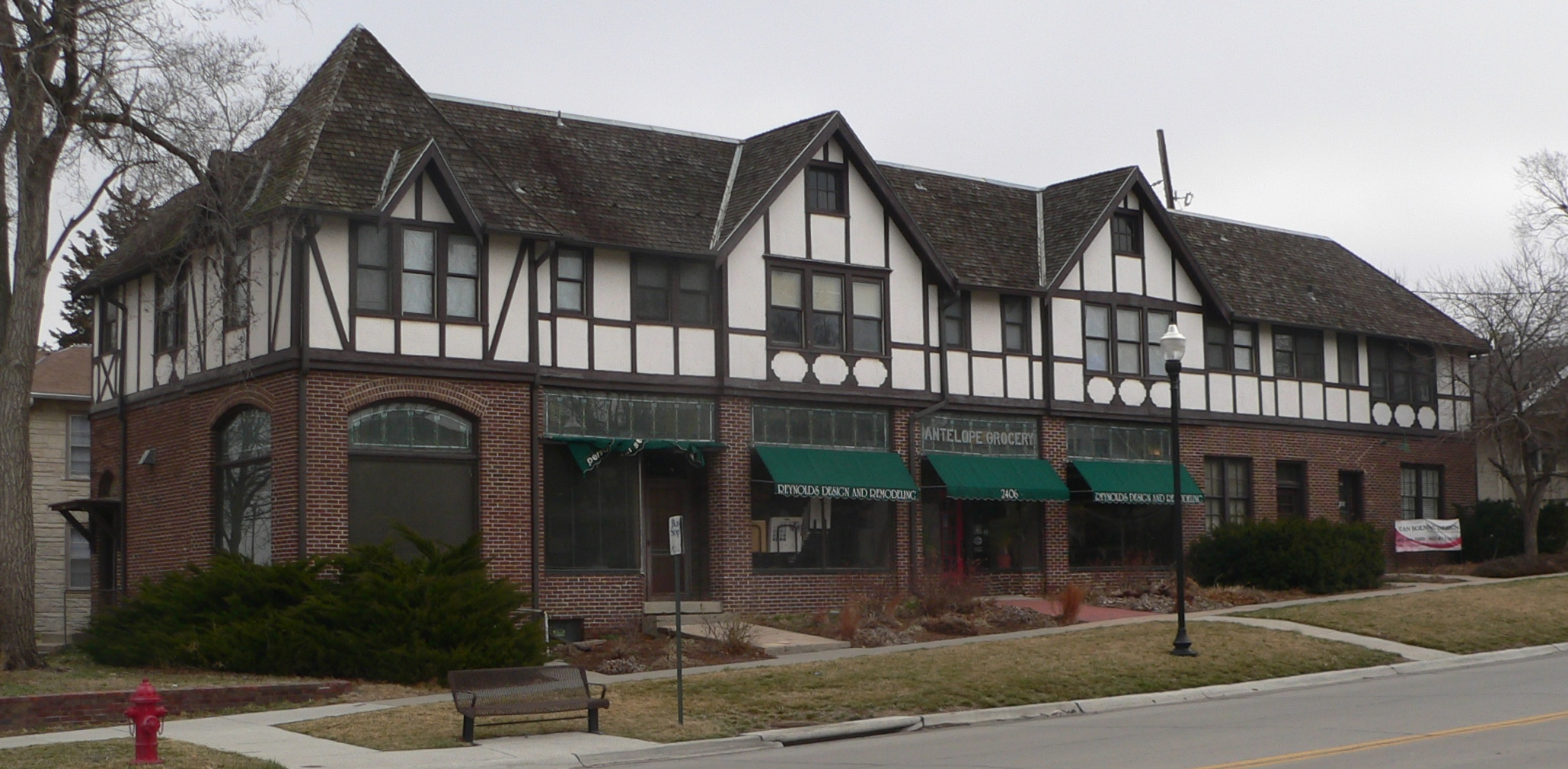
- The building in 2012

- Location within Nebraska Location within the United States
- Location: 2406 J Street, Lincoln, Nebraska
- Coordinates: 40°48′30″N 96°41′09″W
- Area: less than one acre
- Built: 1922
- Architect: Fiske & Meginnis
- Architectural style: Tudor Revival
- NRHP reference No.: 88000213
- Added to NRHP: March 17, 1988

Antelope Grocery is a historic mixed-use building in Lincoln, Nebraska. It was built in 1922 for Roy B. Palin and his wife Julia, with a grocery store on the first floor and residential apartments on the second floor. It was designed in the Tudor Revival style by the architectural firm Fiske & Meginnis. It has been listed on the National Register of Historic Places since March 17, 1988.
