= Federal Trust Building =

- U.S. National Register of Historic Places
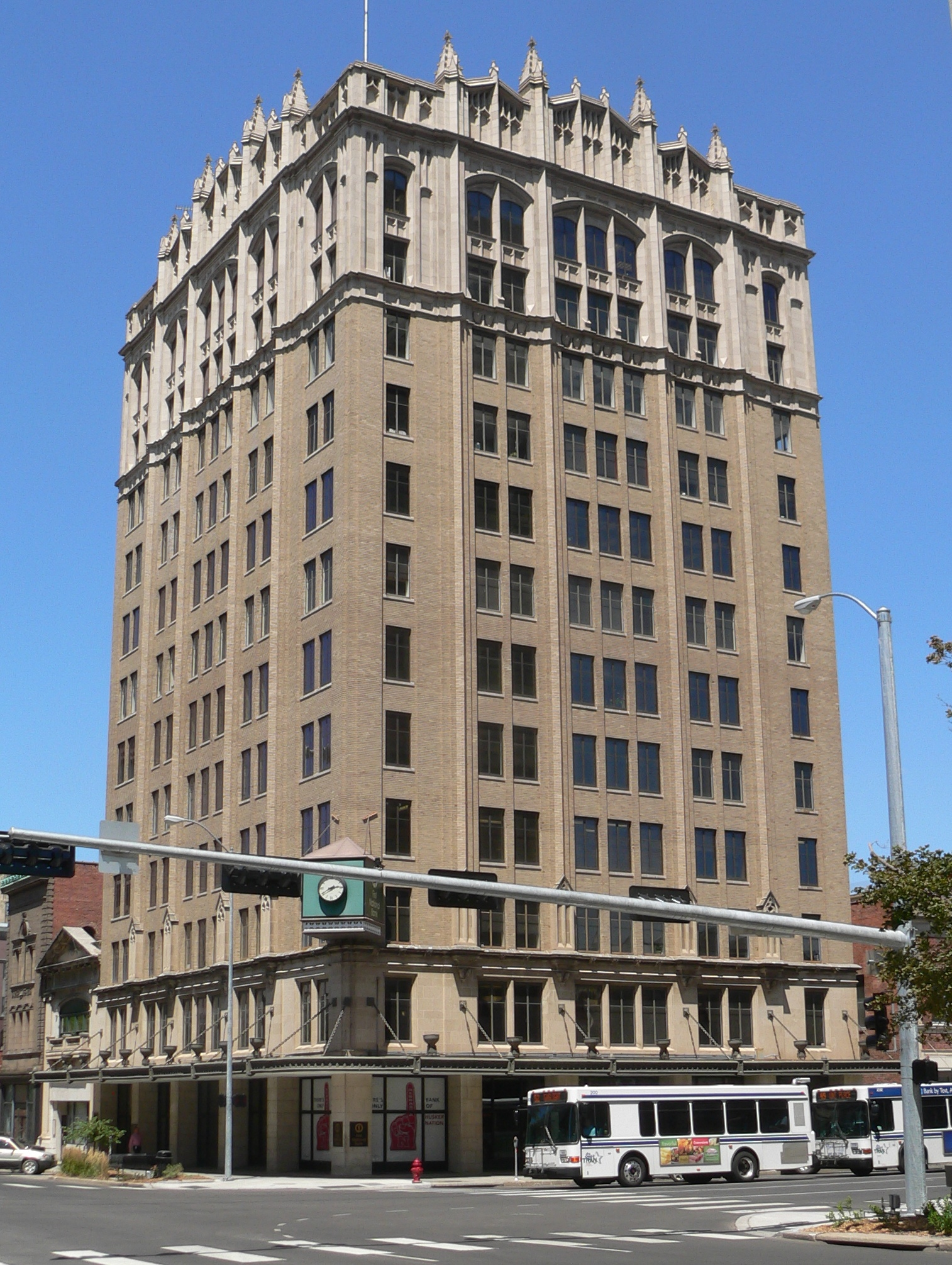
- The building in 2012

- Location within Nebraska Location within the United States
- Location: 134 South 13th Street, Lincoln, Nebraska
- Coordinates: 40°48′46″N 96°42′05″W
- Area: less than one acre
- Built: 1927
- Built by: Olson Construction Company
- Architect: Meginnis and Schaumberg
- Architectural style: Gothic Revival
- NRHP reference No.: 02000409
- Added to NRHP: April 25, 2002

The Federal Trust Building is a historic 12-story office building in Lincoln, Nebraska. It was built by the Olson Construction Company in 1926-1927 for the Federal Trust Company, an investment and insurance company co-founded by Carl E. Reynolds and Ira E. Atkinson. The building was designed in the Gothic Revival style by Meginnis and Schaumberg, an architectural firm co-founded by Harry Meginnis and Edward G. Schaumberg. It has been listed on the National Register of Historic Places since April 25, 2002.
