= Worsley-Burnette House =

Historic house in North Carolina, United States

- U.S. National Register of Historic Places
- Location within North Carolina Location within the United States
- Location: SR 1526 N of jct. with SR 1540, near Conetoe, North Carolina
- Coordinates: 35°51′44″N 77°26′13″W
- Area: 7 acres (2.8 ha)
- Built: c. 1830, c. 1850
- Architectural style: Greek Revival, Federal
- NRHP reference No.: 90000791
- Added to NRHP: May 24, 1990

Worsley-Burnette House is a historic plantation house located near Conetoe, Edgecombe County, North Carolina. The original section was built about 1830, as a two-story, hall-and-parlor plan, Federal style frame dwelling. It was expanded about 1850 with a Greek Revival style end wing.

It was listed on the National Register of Historic Places in 1990.
