= Meginnis and Schaumberg =

Architectural firm in Lincoln, Nebraska USA

Meginnis and Schaumberg was an architectural firm in Lincoln, Nebraska. The firm lasted from 1925 until 1943 when partner Harry Meginnis died. The firm designed several buildings listed on the National Register of Historic Places and three buildings on University of Nebraska–Lincoln's East Campus as well as the Mueller Tower on its City Campus.

== History ==
Meginnis trained in his father's construction business and then worked for Dieman & Fiske with Ferdinand C. Fiske in Cedar Rapids, Iowa. Fiske hired Meginnis as a draftsman in his Lincoln office from 1901 until 1907. In 1907 Meginnis moved to Indianapolis and worked at various firms over several years including DuPont & Hunter (1907-1909); H.L. Bass Co. (1909-1914); and Broakie & Meginnis (1914-1915).

The partnership of Fiske and Meginnis was established in 1915 and designed several buildings in Lincoln including several schools including: Prescott, Irving, Whittier, Clinton, and Elliot.

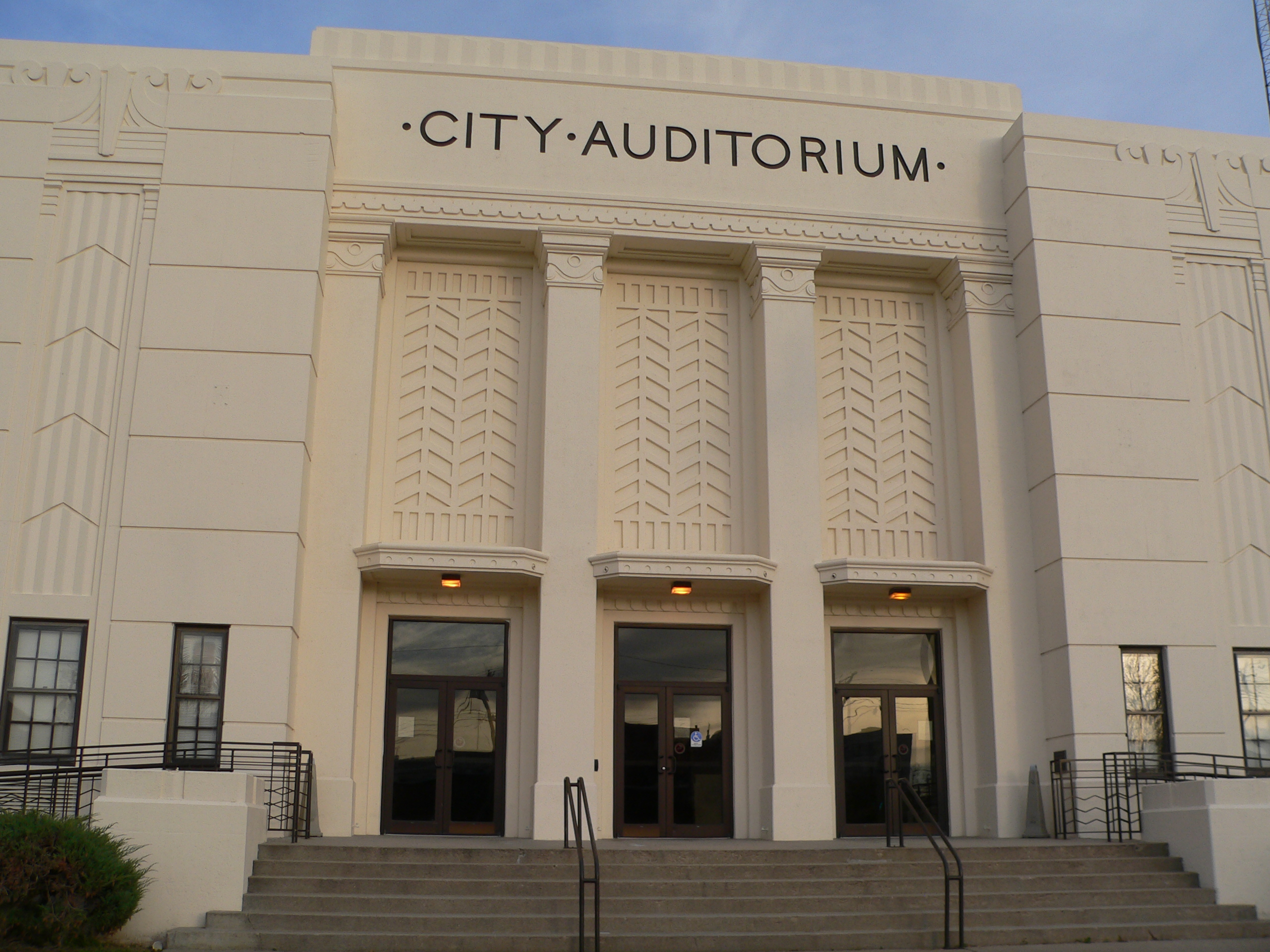
York City Auditorium (1940) in Nebraska

Edward G. Schaumberg joined the firm as a partner in 1924 and it became Fiske, Meginnis, & Schaumberg in 1925. By 1926 the firm became Meginnis and Schaumberg.

== Work ==
- J.C. Ridnour building in the Haymarket District

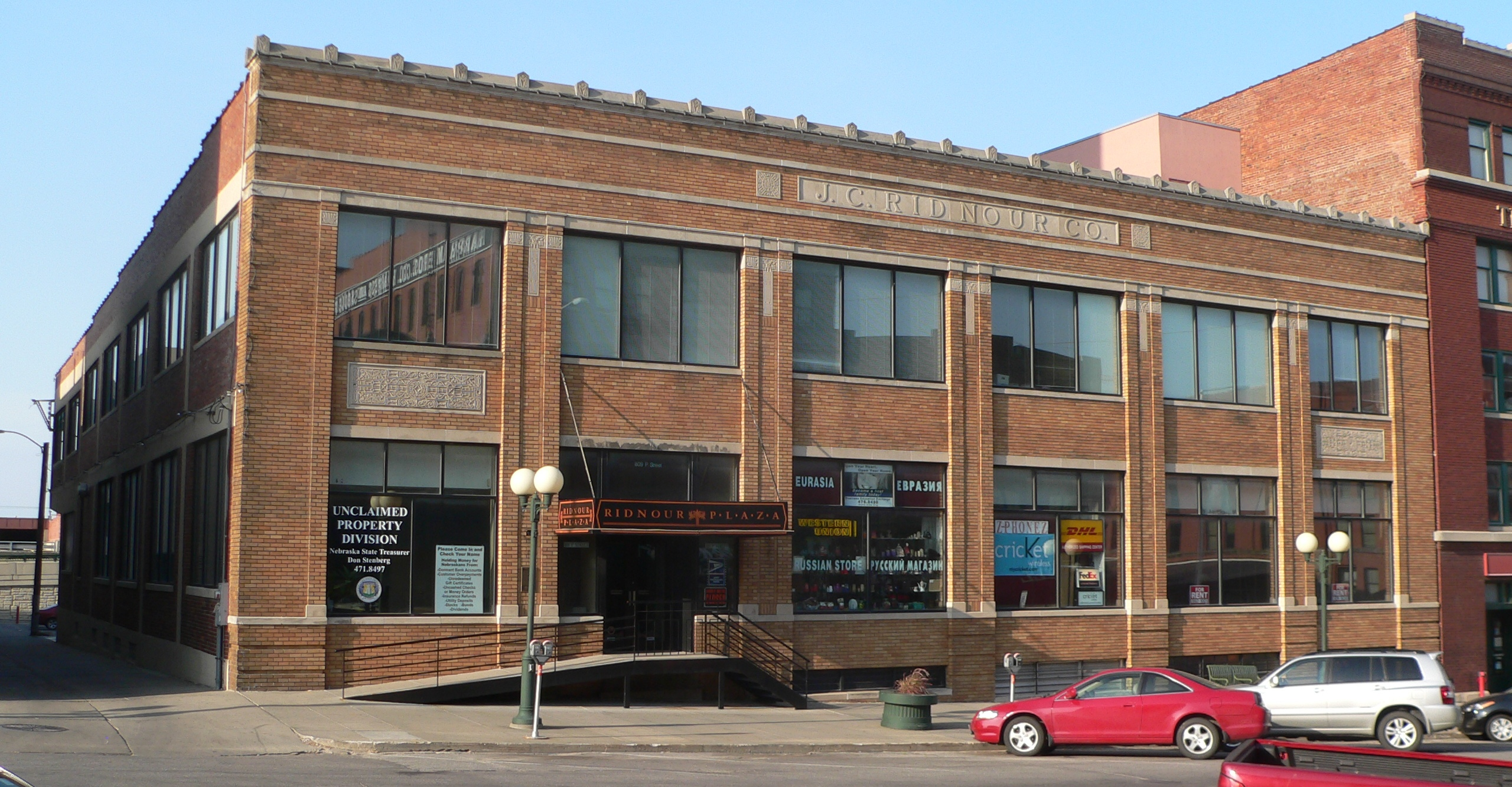
J.C. Ridnour Co. building in Lincoln, Nebraska's Haymarket District

- Federal Trust Building at 13th and N
- Federal Trust Building, 134 S. 13th St. Lincoln, NE Meginnis and Schaumberg NRHP listed
- Remodel of the Lincoln Liberty Life Insurance Building at 11th and O. Art Deco style
- Lincoln Liberty Life Insurance Building, 113 N. Eleventh St. Lincoln, NE Meginnis, Harry NRHP listed
- Antelope Grocery, 2406 J St. Lincoln, NE Meginnis, Harry NRHP listed
- Lincoln YWCA Building, 1432 N St. Lincoln, NE Meginnis & Schaumberg NRHP listed
- Masonic Temple, 1635 L St. Lincoln, NE Meginnis and Schaumberg NRHP listed
- Phi Kappa Tau Fraternity House, 5305 Huntington Ave. Lincoln, NE Meginnis, Harry NRHP listed
- Strang School District No. 36, Main St. Strang, NE Meginnis & Schaumberg. NRHP listed
- York City Auditorium (1940), an Art Deco building by Meginnis & Schaumberg
