= Parker–Burnett House =

Historic house in Massachusetts, United States

- U.S. National Register of Historic Places
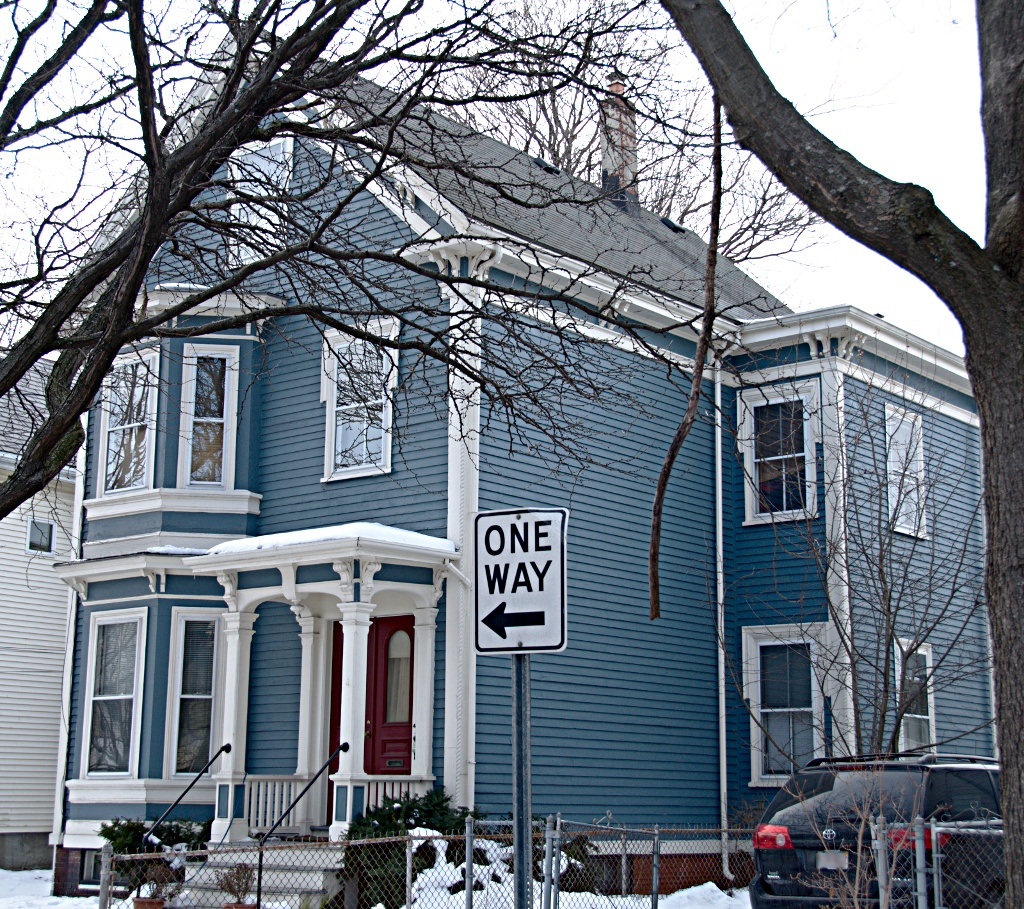

- Location within Massachusetts Location within the United States
- Location: 48 Vinal Avenue, Somerville, Massachusetts
- Coordinates: 42°23′5.46″N 71°5′49.42″W
- Built: 1873
- Architectural style: Italianate
- MPS: Somerville MPS
- NRHP reference No.: 89001291
- Added to NRHP: September 18, 1989

The Parker–Burnett House is a historic house in Somerville, Massachusetts. The Italianate style 2 1/2-story wood-frame house was built c. 1873–74 by Silas Parker, a builder who sold the completed house to James Burnett, a blacksmith. The house has paired brackets in the eaves and gables, which are matched by brackets along the cornice lines of the two-story projecting bay window. The front porch has more ornate brackets, and is supported by square pillars resting on paneled piers and capped by Ionic tops.

The house was listed on the National Register of Historic Places in 1989.

== See also ==
- National Register of Historic Places listings in Somerville, Massachusetts
