= Burnett–Montgomery House =

Historic house in Iowa, United States

- U.S. National Register of Historic Places
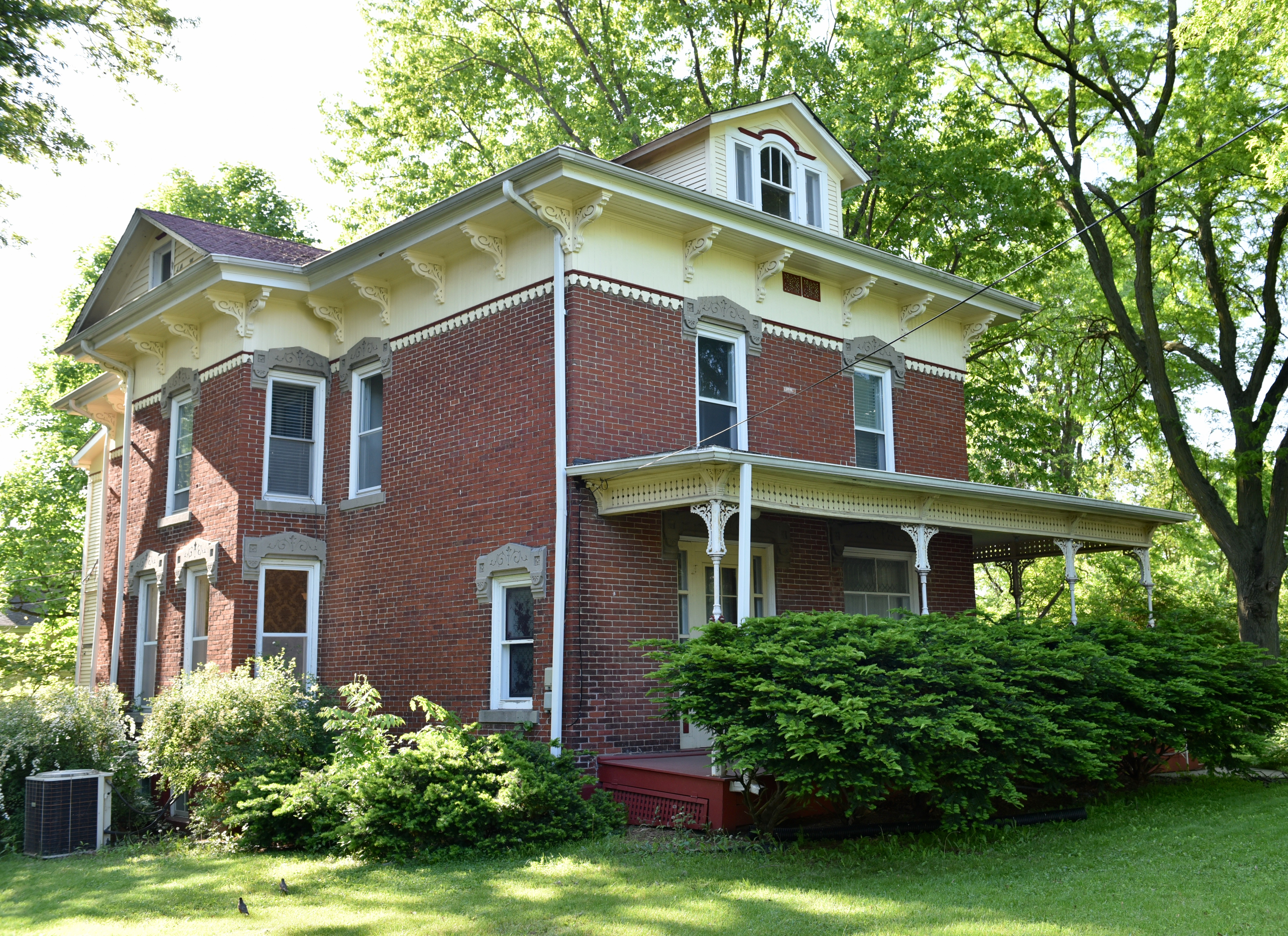

- Location within Iowa Location within the United States
- Location: 605 N. 3rd St., Fairfield, Iowa
- Coordinates: 41°0′49″N 91°57′57″W
- Area: less than one acre
- Built: 1888
- Architect: James H. Montgomery
- Architectural style: Italianate
- NRHP reference No.: 83000372
- Added to NRHP: January 27, 1983

The Burnett–Montgomery House (also known as the James H. Montgomery House) is a historic house located at 605 North Third Street in Fairfield, Iowa.

== Description and history ==
Burnett was a lumber merchant who had the house built in 1888. James H. Montgomery was a partner in Joel Turney & Co., which manufactured farm wagons and was largest private-sector employer in Jefferson County before World War I. The factory closed in 1932 as a result of the Great Depression and the decline in the use of horse-drawn wagons. This two-story brick house was designed in the Italianate style. It features a wrap-around porch and a two-story frame carriage house behind it. The house's historical significance is derived from its architecture and its association with the development of industry in Fairfield.

It was listed on the National Register of Historic Places on January 27, 1983.
