= Reese House =

Historic house in North Carolina, United States

- U.S. National Register of Historic Places
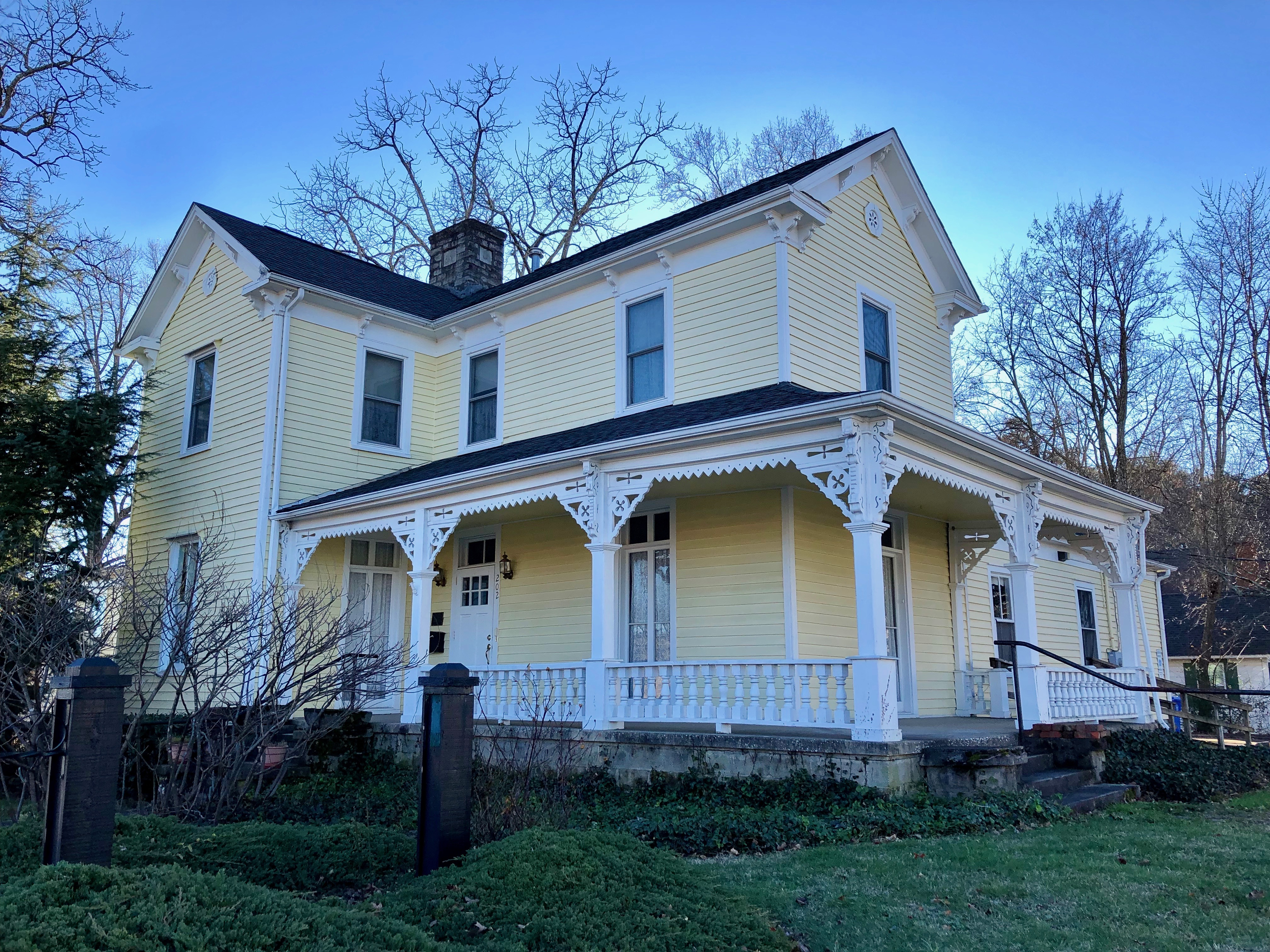
- Reese House, January 2019

- Location within North Carolina Location within the United States
- Location: 202 S. Washington St., Hendersonville, North Carolina
- Coordinates: 35°18′46″N 82°27′44″W
- Area: less than one acre
- Built: c. 1885
- Built by: Brown, James
- Architectural style: Queen Anne
- MPS: Hendersonville MPS
- NRHP reference No.: 95000676
- Added to NRHP: June 2, 1995

Reese House is a historic home located at Hendersonville, Henderson County, North Carolina. It was built about 1885, and is a two-story, T-shaped Queen Anne style frame dwelling. It is sheathed in weatherboard and has a one-story rear ell. It features a single projecting bay and an ornate wraparound porch.

It was listed on the National Register of Historic Places in 1995.
