= Burnett House (Searcy, Arkansas) =

Historic house in Arkansas, United States

- U.S. National Register of Historic Places
- Location within Arkansas Location within the United States
- Nearest city: Searcy, Arkansas
- Coordinates: 35°15′55″N 91°47′4″W
- Area: less than one acre
- Built: 1870
- Architectural style: Vernacular ell-shaped
- MPS: White County MPS
- NRHP reference No.: 91001337
- Added to NRHP: July 11, 1992

The Burnett House was a historic house in rural White County, Arkansas. It was located on the north side of County Road 766, about 0.75 miles (1.21 km) west of County Road 760, and about 3 miles (4.8 km) northwest of the center of Searcy. It was a two-story I-house with a side gable roof, weatherboard siding, a full-width two-story porch across its front, and a rear ell. The porch was supported by Craftsman-style posts set on stone piers, a likely 20th-century alteration. The house was built about 1870, and typified rural vernacular construction in the county from the period, and was one of the only known examples to survive with the ell.

The house was listed on the National Register of Historic Places in 1992. It has been listed as destroyed in the Arkansas Historic Preservation Program database.

== See also ==
- National Register of Historic Places listings in White County, Arkansas
