= Fiske & Meginnis =

American architecture firm

Fiske & Meginnis, Architects was an architecture firm partnership from 1915–1924 between Ferdinand C. Fiske (1856–1930) and Harry Meginnis in Lincoln, Nebraska. Twelve of the buildings they designed are listed on the National Register of Historic Places (NRHP). The two men have additional buildings listed on the National Register with other partnerships or individually credited. Related firms were Fiske and Dieman, Fiske, Meginnis and Schaumberg, and Meginnis and Schaumberg.

Ferdinand C. Fiske was born in New York and raised in Iowa. He was educated at Cornell University and moved to Lincoln during the building boom of 1887 and practiced there the rest of his life. He was a founding partner of firms including Fiske & Dieman (1898–1912); Fiske & Miller (1912–1924); and Fiske, Meginnis, & Schaumberg (1924–1925).

Harry Meginnis did not receive an education in architecture but learned through the construction business. He worked under Fiske at Fiske & Dieman (1901–1909) in their Lincoln office as a draftsman. He had brief stints at several firms in Indianapolis including DuPont & Hunter (1907–1909); H.L. Bass Co. (1909–1914); and Broakie & Meginnis (1914–1915). In 1915, Meginnis returned to Lincoln to start Fiske & Meginnis (1915–1924) and Fiske, Meginnis, & Schaumberg (1924–1925). Meginnis went on to establish Meginnis and Schaumberg (1925–1943) with Edward G. Schaumberg. It lasted until Meginnis died in 1943.

While Fiske and his partners worked under many different styles, Fiske & Meginnis mostly worked within the English Revival realm (Elizabethan, Georgian, and Tudor among others) combined with the Prairie style that Frank Lloyd Wright was concerned with at the time. They were also involved in a significant number of industrial warehouse projects in Lincoln, namely in the Haymarket District.

== Selected works ==
=== Reese House ===
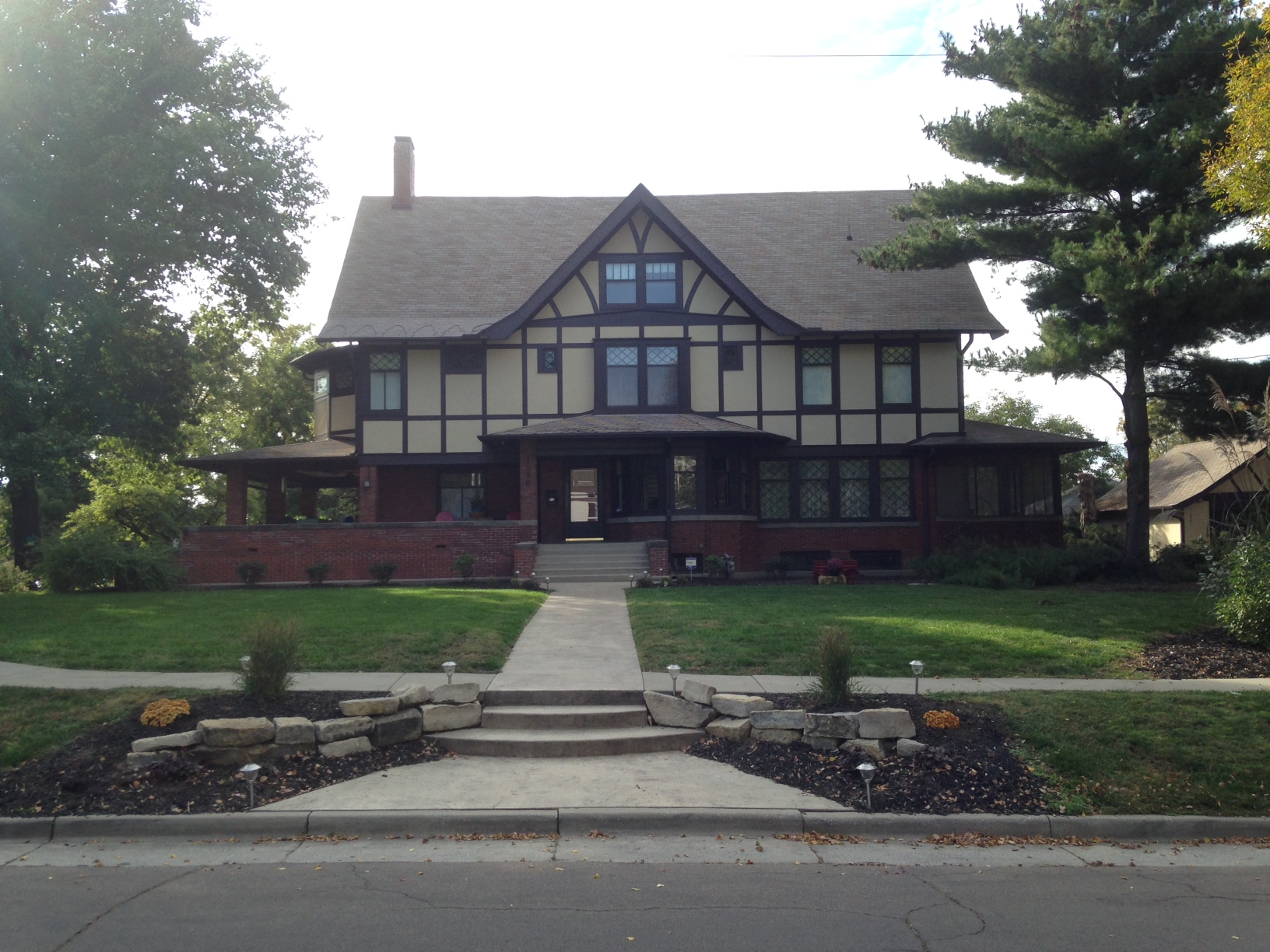
Reese House designed by Fiske and Meginnis in 1907

Located within the Mount Emerald and Capitol Additions District, the Reese House was designed by Fiske and Meginnis in 1907. The Reese House was designed with false-timber work and stucco and large overhanging eaves over the porches placing it into the Tudor-Revival/Prairie-Style category that Fiske & Meginnis were known for especially in their residential projects. This residence was designed for Manoah Bostic Reese and his family who was the chief justice of the Nebraska Supreme Court and also the Dean for the University of Nebraska College of Law.

=== Lincoln Municipal Lighting and Waterworks Building ===
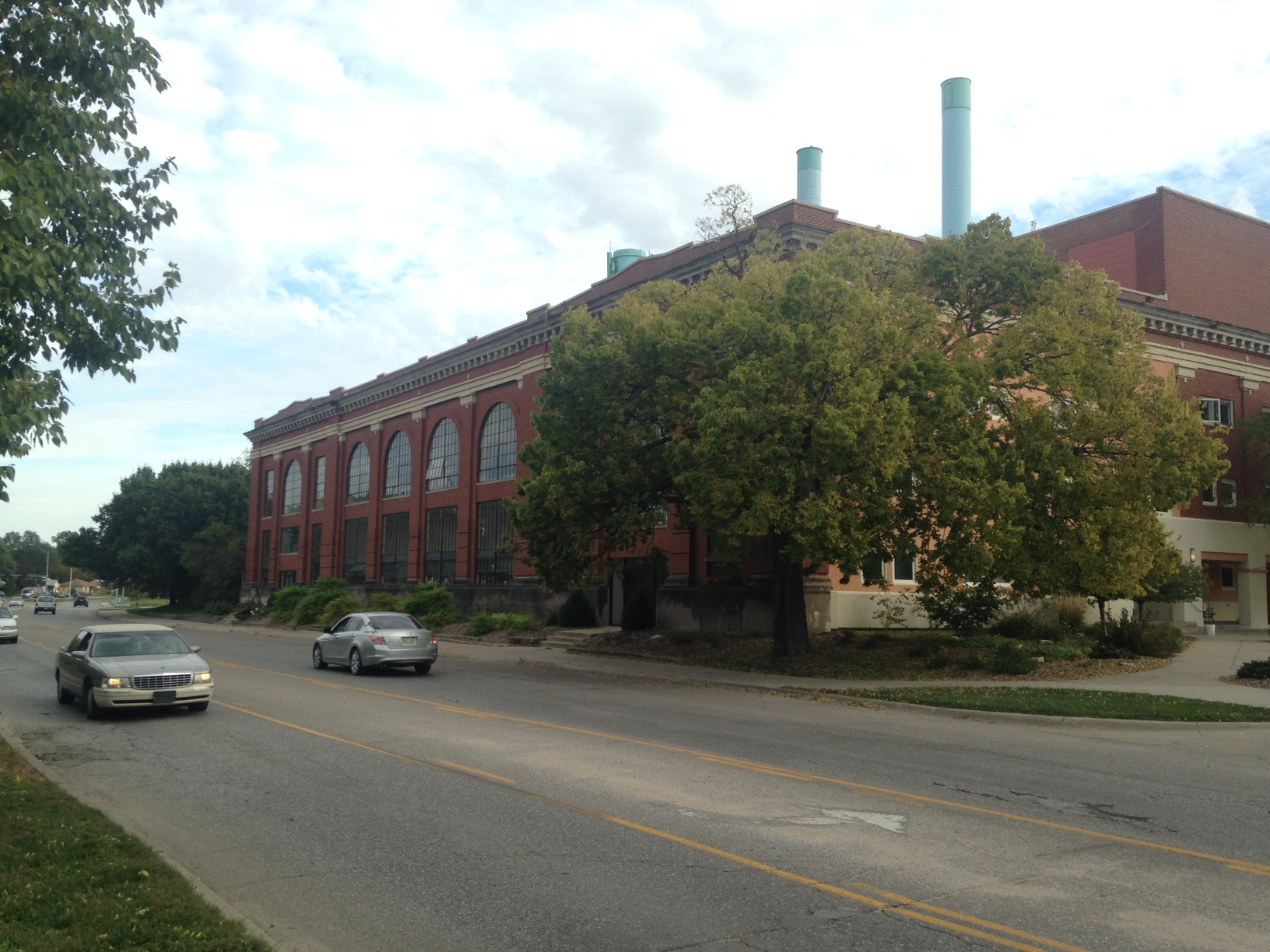
Lincoln Municipal Lighting and Waterworks Plant in 1921

Though it currently stands as an apartment building, Fiske and Meginnis’ A Street landmark was originally built as the Lincoln Municipal Lighting and Waterworks Plant. Much like many of their other public works together, Fiske and Meginnis designed a building easily classified as neoclassical revival. Three, large, and light blue smoke stacks protrude through the flat roof, while the large structure and exterior facade of the building consists of a slightly darker red brick, trimmed with limestone and buff bricks on the cornices. The focal east and north facades are punctured with what appears to be two stories of large glass windows with round heads. But behind this deceptive façade lies a factory-like interior, renovated into apartments. The large first floor and first floor windows leave room for an attic floor above.

=== Antelope Grocery ===
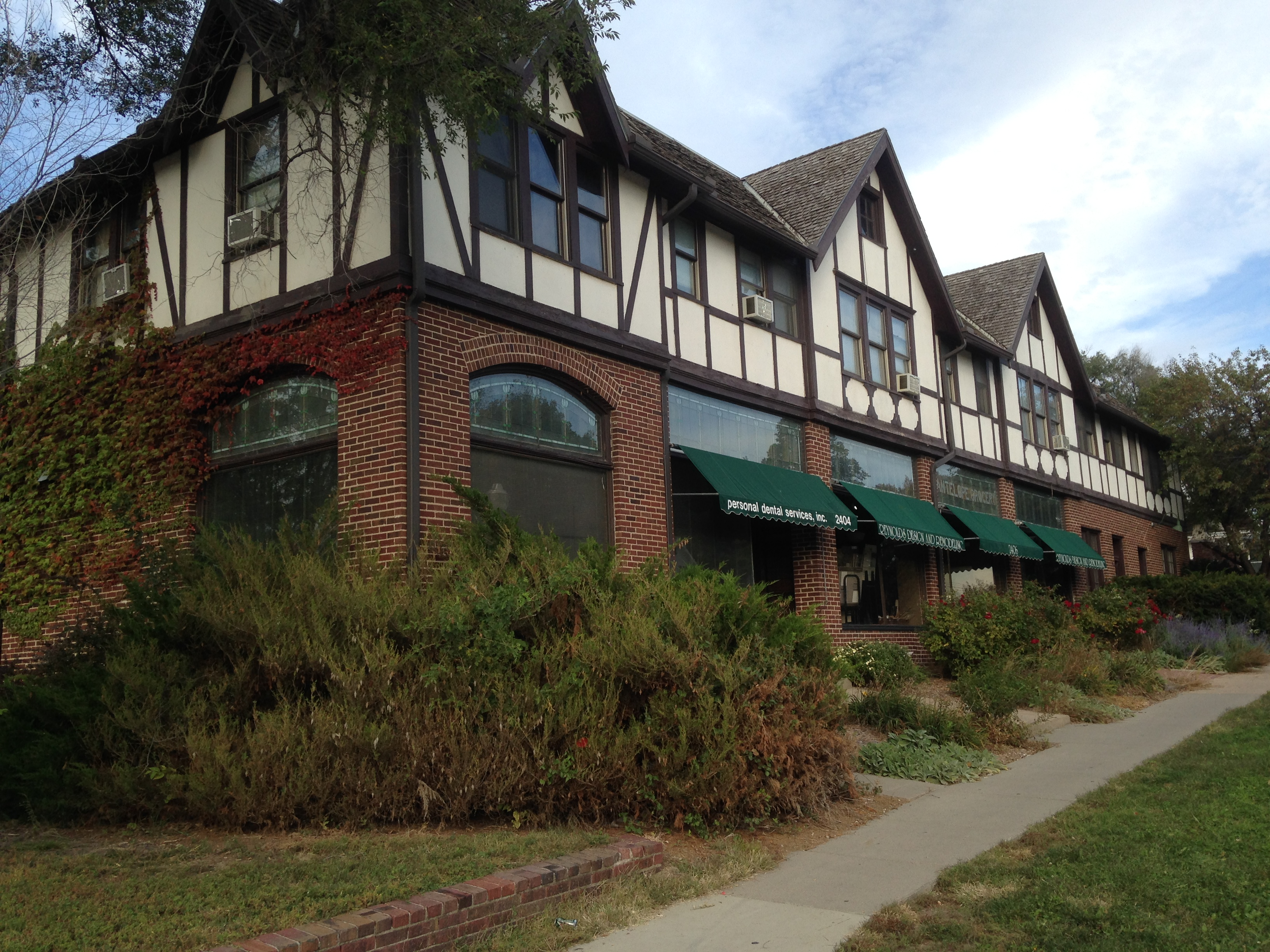
Antelope Grocery designed by Fiske and Meginnis in 1922

Built in 1922, Antelope grocery was constructed as a mixed use (commercial and apartment) building. The two-story brick and stucco structure makes use of architectural elements common to period houses. The store includes a visual usage of Tudor revival-styled elements within the construction and has undergone multiple renovations while retaining a high degree of architectural integrity. This includes the current existence of its original metal framed store-front windows. The lower level of the building remains business, while the upper level is mainly residential apartments. As far as the exterior is concerned, stucco and half-timber form the cladding which traces up to a truncated steeply pitched roof capped with a flat decking. The main modifications to the building's exterior include re roofing and addition of protective glazing over the transoms.

== Complete works ==
Fiske & Meginnis practiced many styles of architecture, which lead to a wide variety of commissions. The firm designed residences, public works buildings, libraries, schools for all levels of education, and warehouses.

Building	Address	Architectural Classification	Partners	Year	Historic
**Agriculture Hall	East campus		Fiske and Dieman	1904	NO
**Alpha Omicron Pi Sorority	1541 S Street	Period Revival/Colonial	Fiske	1926	
Antelope Grocery	2406 J Street	Tudor Revival	Fiske and Meginnis	1922	YES
Auld Public Library	537 N. Webster, Red Cloud, NE	Classical Revival	Fiske and Meginnis	1917	YES
*Carter Transfer Warehouse	311 N. 8th	Warehouse	Fiske and Meginnis	1916	YES
***Charles Stuart House	1830 E Street	Western Stick	Fiske	1910	YES
Clinton Elementary School	1520 N. 29th Street	Elizabethan Revival	Fiske, Meginnis and Schaumberg	1925	NO
**College Activities Building	East Campus		Meginnis and Schaumberg	1926	NO
Edgar Burnett House	3526 Holdrege Street				
Elliot Elementary School	225 S. 25th Street		Fiske and Meginnis	1922	NO
Fairbury Jr/Sr High School	Fairbury, NE	Georgian Revival/ Modernistic	Fiske and Meginnis	1923	YES
Federal Trust Building	134 S. 13th Street	Gothic Revival	Meginnis and Schaumberg	1927	YES
**Food and Nutrition Building	East Campus		Meginnis and Schaumberg	1941	NO
Frank Spaulding House	2221 Sheridan Boulevard	Mission	Fiske	1909	YES
George and Hazel Abel House	2335 Sheridan Boulevard				
George Fawell House	2401 Ryons Street	Period Revival	Fiske	1916	YES
Gillen House	2245 A Street	19th and Early 20th Century Revival	Fiske and Meginnis	1903	YES
*Grainger Brothers Complex	733-737 P Street	Warehouse	Fiske and Dieman	1906	YES
*Grainger Brothers Grocery Warehouse	105 N. 8th Street	Warehouse	Fiske and Meginnis	1912	YES
Hartley Elementary School	730 N. 33rd Street		Fiske and Meginnis	1920	NO
Hayward School Addition	1215 N. 9th Street	Georgian Revival	Fiske, Meginnis, and Schaumberg	1925	YES
***H.E. Sidles House	2110 A Street	Prairie School House	Fiske	1913	YES
*Home Economics Building	East Campus		Fiske and Dieman	1905	NO
***J.R. Moyer House	1140 S. 20th Street	Colonial Revival	Fiske and Meginnis	1916	YES
*Lincoln Drug Company Building	801 P Street	warehouse	Fiske	1905	YES
*Lincoln Fixture and Supply Co. Building	826 P Street	warehouse	Fiske and Meginnis	1922	YES
Loup City Township Carnegie Library	625 N Street, Loup City, NE	Neoclassical Revival	Fiske and Meginnis	1917	YES
**Love Memorial Co-op Hall	East Campus		Meginnis and Schaumberg	1941	NO
***Mayor Don Lover House	1953 B Street	Tudor Revival	Fiske and Meginnis	1916	YES
***Meeker Anderson House	1950 C Street	Tudor Revival/ Prairie style	Fiske	1916	YES
**Mueller Tower	City Campus		Meginnis and Schaumberg	1949	NO
Municipal Lighting and Waterworks Plant	2901 A Street	Neoclassical Revival	Fiske and Meginnis	1921	YES
***N.C. Rogers House	2145 B Street	Jacobethan Revival	Fiske and Miller	1914	YES
***Old Delta Upsilon House	1701 E Street	Eclectic Revival	Meginnis and Schaumberg	1931	YES
Prescott Elementary School	2024 S. 20th Street	Elizabethan Revival	Fiske and Meginnis	1920	NO
*** The Reese House	1990 C Street	Tudor Revival/ Prairie	Fiske and Meginnis	1907	YES
*** Senator Elmer J. Burkett House	1944 B Street	Prairie	Fiske and Miller	1914	YES
*Stacy Brothers Fruit Co.	800 P Street	warehouse	Fiske	1912	YES
*** The Stuart Aunties House	1935 D Street	Tudor Revival/ Prairie	Fiske	1911	YES
***W.E Chapin House	1979 D Street	Tudor Revival/ Prairie	Fiske and Miller	1913	YES
***Whitney-Stephenson-Merritt House	1965 B Street	Second Italian Renaissance Revival	Fiske	1916	YES
Whittier Junior High School	2200 Vine Street	Neoclassical Revival	Fiske and Meginnis	1923	NO

* buildings in Historic Haymarket District
** buildings on the University of Nebraska–Lincoln's campus
*** houses in Mount Emerald Historic District
