= Jesse Boaz Miller =

American architect

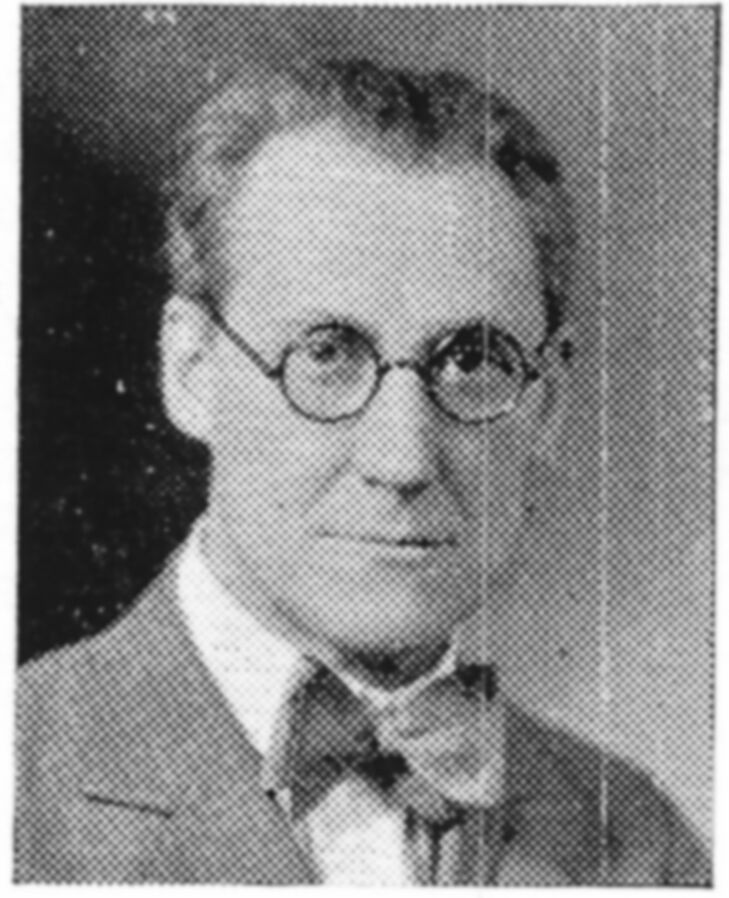
Portrait of Jesse Boaz Miller in 1928

Jesse Boaz Miller (1880-1968) was an American architect who designed many buildings in Nebraska, including the NRHP-listed W.F. Hitchcock House.
