= W.F. Hitchcock House =

- U.S. National Register of Historic Places
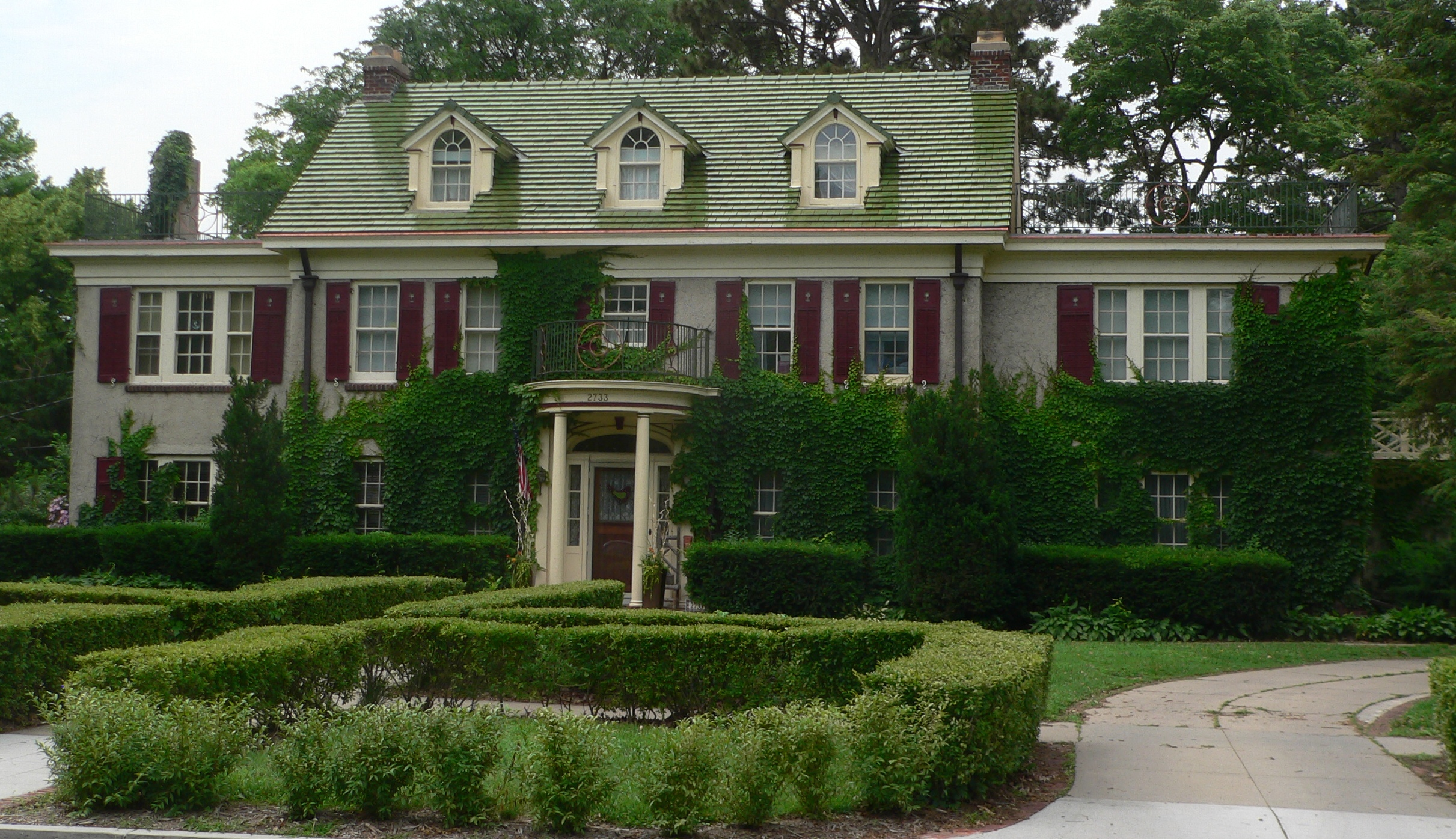
- The house in 2013

- Location within Nebraska Location within the United States
- Location: 2733 Sheridan Boulevard, Lincoln, Nebraska
- Coordinates: 40°47′27″N 96°41′03″W
- Area: 0.4 acres (0.16 ha)
- Built: 1922
- Built by: Peter Hansen
- Architect: Jesse Boaz Miller
- Architectural style: Colonial Revival
- NRHP reference No.: 02001482
- Added to NRHP: December 5, 2002

The W.F. Hitchcock House is a historic two-and-a-half-story house in Lincoln, Nebraska. It was built with gray stucco in 1922 for William F. Hitchcock and his wife Birdie. It was designed in the Colonial Revival style by Jesse Boaz Miller, an architect who designed many houses and structures in Nebraska. It has been listed on the National Register of Historic Places since December 5, 2002.
